

529001–529100 

|-bgcolor=#E9E9E9
| 529001 ||  || — || April 18, 2009 || Kitt Peak || Spacewatch ||  || align=right | 1.2 km || 
|-id=002 bgcolor=#fefefe
| 529002 ||  || — || April 21, 2009 || Mount Lemmon || Mount Lemmon Survey ||  || align=right | 1.1 km || 
|-id=003 bgcolor=#E9E9E9
| 529003 ||  || — || April 30, 2009 || Kitt Peak || Spacewatch ||  || align=right data-sort-value="0.74" | 740 m || 
|-id=004 bgcolor=#fefefe
| 529004 ||  || — || April 19, 2009 || Kitt Peak || Spacewatch ||  || align=right data-sort-value="0.78" | 780 m || 
|-id=005 bgcolor=#fefefe
| 529005 ||  || — || September 12, 2007 || Catalina || CSS || H || align=right data-sort-value="0.68" | 680 m || 
|-id=006 bgcolor=#fefefe
| 529006 ||  || — || May 1, 2009 || Kitt Peak || Spacewatch ||  || align=right data-sort-value="0.69" | 690 m || 
|-id=007 bgcolor=#d6d6d6
| 529007 ||  || — || April 24, 2009 || Catalina || CSS ||  || align=right | 2.4 km || 
|-id=008 bgcolor=#fefefe
| 529008 ||  || — || April 21, 2009 || Kitt Peak || Spacewatch ||  || align=right data-sort-value="0.51" | 510 m || 
|-id=009 bgcolor=#d6d6d6
| 529009 ||  || — || May 15, 2009 || Kitt Peak || Spacewatch ||  || align=right | 1.9 km || 
|-id=010 bgcolor=#d6d6d6
| 529010 ||  || — || April 2, 2009 || Kitt Peak || Spacewatch ||  || align=right | 2.5 km || 
|-id=011 bgcolor=#fefefe
| 529011 ||  || — || March 18, 2009 || Kitt Peak || Spacewatch || H || align=right data-sort-value="0.63" | 630 m || 
|-id=012 bgcolor=#fefefe
| 529012 ||  || — || April 18, 2009 || Kitt Peak || Spacewatch ||  || align=right data-sort-value="0.66" | 660 m || 
|-id=013 bgcolor=#fefefe
| 529013 ||  || — || May 13, 2009 || Kitt Peak || Spacewatch ||  || align=right data-sort-value="0.56" | 560 m || 
|-id=014 bgcolor=#d6d6d6
| 529014 ||  || — || May 15, 2009 || Kitt Peak || Spacewatch ||  || align=right | 2.8 km || 
|-id=015 bgcolor=#FA8072
| 529015 ||  || — || May 3, 2009 || Kitt Peak || Spacewatch ||  || align=right data-sort-value="0.52" | 520 m || 
|-id=016 bgcolor=#d6d6d6
| 529016 ||  || — || April 20, 2009 || Mount Lemmon || Mount Lemmon Survey ||  || align=right | 2.3 km || 
|-id=017 bgcolor=#fefefe
| 529017 ||  || — || April 18, 2009 || Mount Lemmon || Mount Lemmon Survey ||  || align=right data-sort-value="0.57" | 570 m || 
|-id=018 bgcolor=#d6d6d6
| 529018 ||  || — || April 18, 2009 || Mount Lemmon || Mount Lemmon Survey ||  || align=right | 1.9 km || 
|-id=019 bgcolor=#d6d6d6
| 529019 ||  || — || April 18, 2009 || Kitt Peak || Spacewatch ||  || align=right | 2.8 km || 
|-id=020 bgcolor=#fefefe
| 529020 ||  || — || April 27, 2009 || Kitt Peak || Spacewatch ||  || align=right data-sort-value="0.57" | 570 m || 
|-id=021 bgcolor=#d6d6d6
| 529021 ||  || — || April 29, 2009 || Kitt Peak || Spacewatch ||  || align=right | 2.1 km || 
|-id=022 bgcolor=#d6d6d6
| 529022 ||  || — || May 27, 2009 || Kitt Peak || Spacewatch || AEG || align=right | 2.0 km || 
|-id=023 bgcolor=#d6d6d6
| 529023 ||  || — || May 28, 2009 || Mount Lemmon || Mount Lemmon Survey ||  || align=right | 2.7 km || 
|-id=024 bgcolor=#d6d6d6
| 529024 ||  || — || April 25, 2003 || Kitt Peak || Spacewatch ||  || align=right | 3.1 km || 
|-id=025 bgcolor=#fefefe
| 529025 ||  || — || April 24, 2009 || Kitt Peak || Spacewatch ||  || align=right data-sort-value="0.59" | 590 m || 
|-id=026 bgcolor=#d6d6d6
| 529026 ||  || — || May 26, 2009 || Catalina || CSS ||  || align=right | 2.5 km || 
|-id=027 bgcolor=#fefefe
| 529027 ||  || — || May 28, 2009 || Mount Lemmon || Mount Lemmon Survey ||  || align=right data-sort-value="0.80" | 800 m || 
|-id=028 bgcolor=#fefefe
| 529028 ||  || — || June 12, 2009 || Kitt Peak || Spacewatch ||  || align=right data-sort-value="0.73" | 730 m || 
|-id=029 bgcolor=#fefefe
| 529029 ||  || — || June 1, 2009 || Mount Lemmon || Mount Lemmon Survey || H || align=right data-sort-value="0.69" | 690 m || 
|-id=030 bgcolor=#FA8072
| 529030 ||  || — || June 27, 2009 || La Sagra || OAM Obs. ||  || align=right data-sort-value="0.87" | 870 m || 
|-id=031 bgcolor=#E9E9E9
| 529031 ||  || — || August 27, 2005 || Kitt Peak || Spacewatch ||  || align=right | 1.2 km || 
|-id=032 bgcolor=#FFC2E0
| 529032 ||  || — || July 1, 2009 || La Sagra || OAM Obs. || AMO +1km || align=right | 1.1 km || 
|-id=033 bgcolor=#E9E9E9
| 529033 ||  || — || July 13, 2009 || La Sagra || OAM Obs. ||  || align=right | 1.2 km || 
|-id=034 bgcolor=#E9E9E9
| 529034 ||  || — || July 16, 2009 || La Sagra || OAM Obs. ||  || align=right | 1.8 km || 
|-id=035 bgcolor=#E9E9E9
| 529035 ||  || — || July 18, 2009 || Sandlot || G. Hug ||  || align=right | 1.5 km || 
|-id=036 bgcolor=#E9E9E9
| 529036 ||  || — || July 25, 2009 || La Sagra || OAM Obs. ||  || align=right | 1.8 km || 
|-id=037 bgcolor=#E9E9E9
| 529037 ||  || — || July 28, 2009 || La Sagra || OAM Obs. ||  || align=right | 1.2 km || 
|-id=038 bgcolor=#E9E9E9
| 529038 ||  || — || July 27, 2009 || Kitt Peak || Spacewatch ||  || align=right | 1.5 km || 
|-id=039 bgcolor=#E9E9E9
| 529039 ||  || — || July 27, 2009 || Kitt Peak || Spacewatch ||  || align=right | 1.3 km || 
|-id=040 bgcolor=#fefefe
| 529040 ||  || — || July 28, 2009 || Kitt Peak || Spacewatch ||  || align=right data-sort-value="0.72" | 720 m || 
|-id=041 bgcolor=#E9E9E9
| 529041 ||  || — || July 29, 2009 || La Sagra || OAM Obs. ||  || align=right | 1.8 km || 
|-id=042 bgcolor=#E9E9E9
| 529042 ||  || — || July 19, 2009 || Siding Spring || SSS ||  || align=right | 1.1 km || 
|-id=043 bgcolor=#E9E9E9
| 529043 ||  || — || January 27, 2007 || Mount Lemmon || Mount Lemmon Survey ||  || align=right | 2.2 km || 
|-id=044 bgcolor=#fefefe
| 529044 ||  || — || July 27, 2009 || Catalina || CSS ||  || align=right data-sort-value="0.75" | 750 m || 
|-id=045 bgcolor=#fefefe
| 529045 ||  || — || July 29, 2009 || Kitt Peak || Spacewatch ||  || align=right data-sort-value="0.92" | 920 m || 
|-id=046 bgcolor=#E9E9E9
| 529046 ||  || — || July 30, 2009 || Kitt Peak || Spacewatch ||  || align=right | 1.3 km || 
|-id=047 bgcolor=#E9E9E9
| 529047 ||  || — || August 10, 2009 || Kitt Peak || Spacewatch ||  || align=right | 1.1 km || 
|-id=048 bgcolor=#E9E9E9
| 529048 ||  || — || August 14, 2009 || Sandlot || G. Hug ||  || align=right | 1.4 km || 
|-id=049 bgcolor=#E9E9E9
| 529049 ||  || — || July 29, 2009 || Kitt Peak || Spacewatch ||  || align=right | 1.4 km || 
|-id=050 bgcolor=#FA8072
| 529050 ||  || — || August 14, 2009 || Siding Spring || SSS ||  || align=right | 1.6 km || 
|-id=051 bgcolor=#d6d6d6
| 529051 ||  || — || July 27, 2009 || La Sagra || OAM Obs. || THB || align=right | 3.3 km || 
|-id=052 bgcolor=#E9E9E9
| 529052 ||  || — || August 15, 2009 || La Sagra || OAM Obs. ||  || align=right | 1.9 km || 
|-id=053 bgcolor=#E9E9E9
| 529053 ||  || — || August 10, 2009 || Kitt Peak || Spacewatch ||  || align=right | 1.1 km || 
|-id=054 bgcolor=#d6d6d6
| 529054 ||  || — || June 23, 2009 || Mount Lemmon || Mount Lemmon Survey ||  || align=right | 3.2 km || 
|-id=055 bgcolor=#E9E9E9
| 529055 ||  || — || July 28, 2009 || Kitt Peak || Spacewatch ||  || align=right | 2.3 km || 
|-id=056 bgcolor=#E9E9E9
| 529056 ||  || — || August 15, 2009 || Catalina || CSS ||  || align=right | 1.8 km || 
|-id=057 bgcolor=#E9E9E9
| 529057 ||  || — || August 15, 2009 || La Sagra || OAM Obs. ||  || align=right | 1.7 km || 
|-id=058 bgcolor=#E9E9E9
| 529058 ||  || — || August 15, 2009 || Kitt Peak || Spacewatch ||  || align=right | 1.3 km || 
|-id=059 bgcolor=#E9E9E9
| 529059 ||  || — || October 22, 2005 || Kitt Peak || Spacewatch ||  || align=right | 1.4 km || 
|-id=060 bgcolor=#fefefe
| 529060 ||  || — || August 16, 2009 || La Sagra || OAM Obs. ||  || align=right data-sort-value="0.64" | 640 m || 
|-id=061 bgcolor=#E9E9E9
| 529061 ||  || — || August 16, 2009 || Catalina || CSS ||  || align=right | 1.4 km || 
|-id=062 bgcolor=#E9E9E9
| 529062 ||  || — || August 19, 2009 || Kitt Peak || Spacewatch ||  || align=right | 1.6 km || 
|-id=063 bgcolor=#E9E9E9
| 529063 ||  || — || August 16, 2009 || Kitt Peak || Spacewatch ||  || align=right | 1.1 km || 
|-id=064 bgcolor=#fefefe
| 529064 ||  || — || August 16, 2009 || Kitt Peak || Spacewatch || V || align=right data-sort-value="0.45" | 450 m || 
|-id=065 bgcolor=#E9E9E9
| 529065 ||  || — || August 17, 2009 || Siding Spring || SSS ||  || align=right | 1.6 km || 
|-id=066 bgcolor=#fefefe
| 529066 ||  || — || August 20, 2009 || La Sagra || OAM Obs. ||  || align=right | 1.1 km || 
|-id=067 bgcolor=#fefefe
| 529067 ||  || — || August 18, 2009 || Catalina || CSS ||  || align=right data-sort-value="0.93" | 930 m || 
|-id=068 bgcolor=#E9E9E9
| 529068 ||  || — || August 16, 2009 || La Sagra || OAM Obs. ||  || align=right | 1.7 km || 
|-id=069 bgcolor=#fefefe
| 529069 ||  || — || August 16, 2009 || Kitt Peak || Spacewatch || NYS || align=right data-sort-value="0.61" | 610 m || 
|-id=070 bgcolor=#d6d6d6
| 529070 ||  || — || August 23, 2009 || Dauban || F. Kugel ||  || align=right | 2.1 km || 
|-id=071 bgcolor=#E9E9E9
| 529071 ||  || — || August 19, 2009 || La Sagra || OAM Obs. ||  || align=right | 1.9 km || 
|-id=072 bgcolor=#fefefe
| 529072 ||  || — || August 18, 2009 || Catalina || CSS ||  || align=right data-sort-value="0.83" | 830 m || 
|-id=073 bgcolor=#E9E9E9
| 529073 ||  || — || August 21, 2009 || Socorro || LINEAR ||  || align=right | 2.2 km || 
|-id=074 bgcolor=#fefefe
| 529074 ||  || — || August 20, 2009 || Kitt Peak || Spacewatch ||  || align=right data-sort-value="0.59" | 590 m || 
|-id=075 bgcolor=#E9E9E9
| 529075 ||  || — || August 24, 2009 || La Sagra || OAM Obs. ||  || align=right | 1.8 km || 
|-id=076 bgcolor=#E9E9E9
| 529076 ||  || — || August 28, 2009 || Catalina || CSS ||  || align=right | 1.8 km || 
|-id=077 bgcolor=#E9E9E9
| 529077 ||  || — || August 20, 2009 || Kitt Peak || Spacewatch ||  || align=right | 1.1 km || 
|-id=078 bgcolor=#fefefe
| 529078 ||  || — || August 20, 2009 || Kitt Peak || Spacewatch ||  || align=right data-sort-value="0.62" | 620 m || 
|-id=079 bgcolor=#E9E9E9
| 529079 ||  || — || August 25, 2009 || La Sagra || OAM Obs. ||  || align=right | 1.8 km || 
|-id=080 bgcolor=#E9E9E9
| 529080 ||  || — || August 15, 2009 || Kitt Peak || Spacewatch ||  || align=right | 2.0 km || 
|-id=081 bgcolor=#E9E9E9
| 529081 ||  || — || August 27, 2009 || Bergisch Gladbach || W. Bickel || HNS || align=right | 1.4 km || 
|-id=082 bgcolor=#E9E9E9
| 529082 ||  || — || August 28, 2009 || La Sagra || OAM Obs. ||  || align=right | 1.8 km || 
|-id=083 bgcolor=#E9E9E9
| 529083 ||  || — || August 18, 2009 || Catalina || CSS ||  || align=right | 1.7 km || 
|-id=084 bgcolor=#E9E9E9
| 529084 ||  || — || August 20, 2009 || Kitt Peak || Spacewatch || JUN || align=right data-sort-value="0.97" | 970 m || 
|-id=085 bgcolor=#E9E9E9
| 529085 ||  || — || August 17, 2009 || Kitt Peak || Spacewatch ||  || align=right data-sort-value="0.77" | 770 m || 
|-id=086 bgcolor=#E9E9E9
| 529086 ||  || — || August 19, 2009 || Kitt Peak || Spacewatch || DOR || align=right | 2.2 km || 
|-id=087 bgcolor=#E9E9E9
| 529087 ||  || — || August 27, 2009 || Kitt Peak || Spacewatch || HNS || align=right data-sort-value="0.81" | 810 m || 
|-id=088 bgcolor=#E9E9E9
| 529088 ||  || — || August 21, 2009 || Socorro || LINEAR ||  || align=right | 1.3 km || 
|-id=089 bgcolor=#d6d6d6
| 529089 ||  || — || August 28, 2009 || La Sagra || OAM Obs. || Tj (2.98) || align=right | 3.3 km || 
|-id=090 bgcolor=#E9E9E9
| 529090 ||  || — || August 18, 2009 || Kitt Peak || Spacewatch ||  || align=right | 2.2 km || 
|-id=091 bgcolor=#E9E9E9
| 529091 ||  || — || August 15, 2009 || Kitt Peak || Spacewatch ||  || align=right | 1.3 km || 
|-id=092 bgcolor=#E9E9E9
| 529092 ||  || — || August 20, 2009 || Socorro || LINEAR ||  || align=right | 2.8 km || 
|-id=093 bgcolor=#fefefe
| 529093 ||  || — || September 12, 2009 || Kitt Peak || Spacewatch || H || align=right data-sort-value="0.42" | 420 m || 
|-id=094 bgcolor=#E9E9E9
| 529094 ||  || — || September 12, 2009 || Kitt Peak || Spacewatch ||  || align=right | 1.0 km || 
|-id=095 bgcolor=#fefefe
| 529095 ||  || — || August 28, 2009 || Catalina || CSS ||  || align=right data-sort-value="0.89" | 890 m || 
|-id=096 bgcolor=#E9E9E9
| 529096 ||  || — || September 14, 2009 || Kitt Peak || Spacewatch || HNS || align=right data-sort-value="0.97" | 970 m || 
|-id=097 bgcolor=#d6d6d6
| 529097 ||  || — || July 28, 2009 || Kitt Peak || Spacewatch ||  || align=right | 3.0 km || 
|-id=098 bgcolor=#E9E9E9
| 529098 ||  || — || August 29, 2009 || La Sagra || OAM Obs. || MAR || align=right | 1.4 km || 
|-id=099 bgcolor=#E9E9E9
| 529099 ||  || — || September 13, 2009 || Socorro || LINEAR ||  || align=right | 1.8 km || 
|-id=100 bgcolor=#E9E9E9
| 529100 ||  || — || September 14, 2009 || Kitt Peak || Spacewatch ||  || align=right data-sort-value="0.64" | 640 m || 
|}

529101–529200 

|-bgcolor=#E9E9E9
| 529101 ||  || — || September 14, 2009 || Kitt Peak || Spacewatch ||  || align=right | 1.3 km || 
|-id=102 bgcolor=#fefefe
| 529102 ||  || — || September 15, 2009 || Kitt Peak || Spacewatch || V || align=right data-sort-value="0.56" | 560 m || 
|-id=103 bgcolor=#fefefe
| 529103 ||  || — || August 18, 2009 || Catalina || CSS ||  || align=right data-sort-value="0.79" | 790 m || 
|-id=104 bgcolor=#E9E9E9
| 529104 ||  || — || September 15, 2009 || Kitt Peak || Spacewatch ||  || align=right | 1.4 km || 
|-id=105 bgcolor=#E9E9E9
| 529105 ||  || — || September 15, 2009 || Kitt Peak || Spacewatch ||  || align=right | 1.4 km || 
|-id=106 bgcolor=#E9E9E9
| 529106 ||  || — || September 15, 2009 || Kitt Peak || Spacewatch ||  || align=right | 1.1 km || 
|-id=107 bgcolor=#E9E9E9
| 529107 ||  || — || September 15, 2009 || Kitt Peak || Spacewatch ||  || align=right | 1.4 km || 
|-id=108 bgcolor=#d6d6d6
| 529108 ||  || — || September 15, 2009 || Kitt Peak || Spacewatch ||  || align=right | 2.0 km || 
|-id=109 bgcolor=#E9E9E9
| 529109 ||  || — || September 15, 2009 || Kitt Peak || Spacewatch ||  || align=right data-sort-value="0.85" | 850 m || 
|-id=110 bgcolor=#E9E9E9
| 529110 ||  || — || September 14, 2009 || Socorro || LINEAR ||  || align=right | 2.1 km || 
|-id=111 bgcolor=#fefefe
| 529111 ||  || — || September 15, 2009 || Kitt Peak || Spacewatch ||  || align=right data-sort-value="0.70" | 700 m || 
|-id=112 bgcolor=#E9E9E9
| 529112 ||  || — || September 15, 2009 || Kitt Peak || Spacewatch ||  || align=right | 1.8 km || 
|-id=113 bgcolor=#E9E9E9
| 529113 ||  || — || September 15, 2009 || Kitt Peak || Spacewatch ||  || align=right | 1.8 km || 
|-id=114 bgcolor=#d6d6d6
| 529114 ||  || — || September 15, 2009 || Kitt Peak || Spacewatch ||  || align=right | 2.1 km || 
|-id=115 bgcolor=#fefefe
| 529115 ||  || — || August 16, 2009 || Catalina || CSS ||  || align=right data-sort-value="0.99" | 990 m || 
|-id=116 bgcolor=#E9E9E9
| 529116 ||  || — || September 15, 2009 || Kitt Peak || Spacewatch ||  || align=right | 2.4 km || 
|-id=117 bgcolor=#E9E9E9
| 529117 ||  || — || September 15, 2009 || Catalina || CSS ||  || align=right | 1.6 km || 
|-id=118 bgcolor=#fefefe
| 529118 ||  || — || September 14, 2009 || Socorro || LINEAR || H || align=right data-sort-value="0.59" | 590 m || 
|-id=119 bgcolor=#E9E9E9
| 529119 ||  || — || September 14, 2009 || Catalina || CSS ||  || align=right | 2.5 km || 
|-id=120 bgcolor=#E9E9E9
| 529120 ||  || — || September 14, 2009 || Socorro || LINEAR ||  || align=right | 1.5 km || 
|-id=121 bgcolor=#E9E9E9
| 529121 ||  || — || August 19, 2009 || Kitt Peak || Spacewatch ||  || align=right | 1.7 km || 
|-id=122 bgcolor=#E9E9E9
| 529122 ||  || — || August 17, 2009 || Catalina || CSS ||  || align=right | 1.3 km || 
|-id=123 bgcolor=#E9E9E9
| 529123 ||  || — || December 21, 2006 || Kitt Peak || Spacewatch ||  || align=right data-sort-value="0.95" | 950 m || 
|-id=124 bgcolor=#E9E9E9
| 529124 ||  || — || August 18, 2009 || Kitt Peak || Spacewatch ||  || align=right | 2.1 km || 
|-id=125 bgcolor=#d6d6d6
| 529125 ||  || — || August 15, 2009 || Kitt Peak || Spacewatch ||  || align=right | 3.1 km || 
|-id=126 bgcolor=#E9E9E9
| 529126 ||  || — || September 13, 2009 || Socorro || LINEAR ||  || align=right | 1.8 km || 
|-id=127 bgcolor=#E9E9E9
| 529127 ||  || — || September 18, 2009 || Catalina || CSS ||  || align=right | 2.5 km || 
|-id=128 bgcolor=#E9E9E9
| 529128 ||  || — || July 30, 2009 || Kitt Peak || Spacewatch ||  || align=right | 1.6 km || 
|-id=129 bgcolor=#E9E9E9
| 529129 ||  || — || September 16, 2009 || Kitt Peak || Spacewatch ||  || align=right | 1.5 km || 
|-id=130 bgcolor=#E9E9E9
| 529130 ||  || — || September 16, 2009 || Kitt Peak || Spacewatch ||  || align=right data-sort-value="0.99" | 990 m || 
|-id=131 bgcolor=#E9E9E9
| 529131 ||  || — || September 16, 2009 || Kitt Peak || Spacewatch ||  || align=right | 1.4 km || 
|-id=132 bgcolor=#E9E9E9
| 529132 ||  || — || September 16, 2009 || Kitt Peak || Spacewatch || MRX || align=right data-sort-value="0.66" | 660 m || 
|-id=133 bgcolor=#E9E9E9
| 529133 ||  || — || September 16, 2009 || Kitt Peak || Spacewatch ||  || align=right | 1.7 km || 
|-id=134 bgcolor=#E9E9E9
| 529134 ||  || — || September 16, 2009 || Kitt Peak || Spacewatch ||  || align=right | 1.5 km || 
|-id=135 bgcolor=#E9E9E9
| 529135 ||  || — || September 16, 2009 || Kitt Peak || Spacewatch || JUN || align=right data-sort-value="0.85" | 850 m || 
|-id=136 bgcolor=#fefefe
| 529136 ||  || — || September 16, 2009 || Kitt Peak || Spacewatch || H || align=right data-sort-value="0.67" | 670 m || 
|-id=137 bgcolor=#E9E9E9
| 529137 ||  || — || September 16, 2009 || Kitt Peak || Spacewatch ||  || align=right | 1.1 km || 
|-id=138 bgcolor=#fefefe
| 529138 ||  || — || September 16, 2009 || Kitt Peak || Spacewatch ||  || align=right data-sort-value="0.68" | 680 m || 
|-id=139 bgcolor=#E9E9E9
| 529139 ||  || — || September 17, 2009 || Kitt Peak || Spacewatch ||  || align=right | 1.3 km || 
|-id=140 bgcolor=#E9E9E9
| 529140 ||  || — || September 17, 2009 || Kitt Peak || Spacewatch ||  || align=right | 1.3 km || 
|-id=141 bgcolor=#E9E9E9
| 529141 ||  || — || September 17, 2009 || Catalina || CSS ||  || align=right | 1.1 km || 
|-id=142 bgcolor=#E9E9E9
| 529142 ||  || — || September 17, 2009 || Kitt Peak || Spacewatch ||  || align=right | 1.7 km || 
|-id=143 bgcolor=#E9E9E9
| 529143 ||  || — || September 17, 2009 || Kitt Peak || Spacewatch ||  || align=right | 1.6 km || 
|-id=144 bgcolor=#E9E9E9
| 529144 ||  || — || September 17, 2009 || Kitt Peak || Spacewatch ||  || align=right | 1.0 km || 
|-id=145 bgcolor=#E9E9E9
| 529145 ||  || — || September 17, 2009 || Kitt Peak || Spacewatch ||  || align=right | 1.7 km || 
|-id=146 bgcolor=#E9E9E9
| 529146 ||  || — || September 17, 2009 || Mount Lemmon || Mount Lemmon Survey ||  || align=right | 1.3 km || 
|-id=147 bgcolor=#E9E9E9
| 529147 ||  || — || August 27, 2009 || Kitt Peak || Spacewatch ||  || align=right | 1.1 km || 
|-id=148 bgcolor=#fefefe
| 529148 ||  || — || September 17, 2009 || Mount Lemmon || Mount Lemmon Survey ||  || align=right data-sort-value="0.57" | 570 m || 
|-id=149 bgcolor=#E9E9E9
| 529149 ||  || — || September 17, 2009 || Kitt Peak || Spacewatch ||  || align=right | 1.2 km || 
|-id=150 bgcolor=#E9E9E9
| 529150 ||  || — || September 17, 2009 || Kitt Peak || Spacewatch ||  || align=right | 2.2 km || 
|-id=151 bgcolor=#E9E9E9
| 529151 ||  || — || September 18, 2009 || Kitt Peak || Spacewatch ||  || align=right data-sort-value="0.82" | 820 m || 
|-id=152 bgcolor=#E9E9E9
| 529152 ||  || — || September 11, 2009 || Catalina || CSS ||  || align=right | 1.6 km || 
|-id=153 bgcolor=#E9E9E9
| 529153 ||  || — || September 22, 2009 || La Sagra || OAM Obs. ||  || align=right | 2.2 km || 
|-id=154 bgcolor=#E9E9E9
| 529154 ||  || — || September 25, 2009 || La Sagra || OAM Obs. ||  || align=right | 1.8 km || 
|-id=155 bgcolor=#E9E9E9
| 529155 ||  || — || September 14, 2009 || Socorro || LINEAR ||  || align=right | 1.8 km || 
|-id=156 bgcolor=#E9E9E9
| 529156 ||  || — || October 27, 2005 || Kitt Peak || Spacewatch ||  || align=right | 1.3 km || 
|-id=157 bgcolor=#E9E9E9
| 529157 ||  || — || September 18, 2009 || Kitt Peak || Spacewatch ||  || align=right | 1.4 km || 
|-id=158 bgcolor=#E9E9E9
| 529158 ||  || — || September 18, 2009 || Kitt Peak || Spacewatch ||  || align=right | 1.9 km || 
|-id=159 bgcolor=#E9E9E9
| 529159 ||  || — || September 18, 2009 || Kitt Peak || Spacewatch ||  || align=right data-sort-value="0.70" | 700 m || 
|-id=160 bgcolor=#E9E9E9
| 529160 ||  || — || July 28, 2009 || Kitt Peak || Spacewatch || JUN || align=right data-sort-value="0.76" | 760 m || 
|-id=161 bgcolor=#E9E9E9
| 529161 ||  || — || April 29, 2003 || Kitt Peak || Spacewatch ||  || align=right | 2.3 km || 
|-id=162 bgcolor=#fefefe
| 529162 ||  || — || September 18, 2009 || Kitt Peak || Spacewatch ||  || align=right data-sort-value="0.64" | 640 m || 
|-id=163 bgcolor=#E9E9E9
| 529163 ||  || — || August 28, 2009 || Socorro || LINEAR ||  || align=right | 2.2 km || 
|-id=164 bgcolor=#E9E9E9
| 529164 ||  || — || September 18, 2009 || Kitt Peak || Spacewatch ||  || align=right | 1.2 km || 
|-id=165 bgcolor=#E9E9E9
| 529165 ||  || — || September 18, 2009 || Kitt Peak || Spacewatch ||  || align=right | 1.3 km || 
|-id=166 bgcolor=#E9E9E9
| 529166 ||  || — || September 18, 2009 || Kitt Peak || Spacewatch ||  || align=right | 1.5 km || 
|-id=167 bgcolor=#E9E9E9
| 529167 ||  || — || September 18, 2009 || Kitt Peak || Spacewatch ||  || align=right data-sort-value="0.65" | 650 m || 
|-id=168 bgcolor=#E9E9E9
| 529168 ||  || — || September 18, 2009 || Kitt Peak || Spacewatch || AEO || align=right data-sort-value="0.95" | 950 m || 
|-id=169 bgcolor=#E9E9E9
| 529169 ||  || — || September 18, 2009 || Kitt Peak || Spacewatch || EUN || align=right data-sort-value="0.96" | 960 m || 
|-id=170 bgcolor=#E9E9E9
| 529170 ||  || — || September 18, 2009 || Kitt Peak || Spacewatch ||  || align=right | 1.5 km || 
|-id=171 bgcolor=#E9E9E9
| 529171 ||  || — || September 19, 2009 || Kitt Peak || Spacewatch ||  || align=right data-sort-value="0.80" | 800 m || 
|-id=172 bgcolor=#fefefe
| 529172 ||  || — || September 15, 2009 || Kitt Peak || Spacewatch ||  || align=right data-sort-value="0.62" | 620 m || 
|-id=173 bgcolor=#d6d6d6
| 529173 ||  || — || August 27, 2009 || La Sagra || OAM Obs. || THB || align=right | 3.3 km || 
|-id=174 bgcolor=#E9E9E9
| 529174 ||  || — || September 20, 2009 || Kitt Peak || Spacewatch ||  || align=right | 1.4 km || 
|-id=175 bgcolor=#fefefe
| 529175 ||  || — || September 14, 2009 || Socorro || LINEAR ||  || align=right data-sort-value="0.73" | 730 m || 
|-id=176 bgcolor=#E9E9E9
| 529176 ||  || — || September 20, 2009 || Kitt Peak || Spacewatch || MRX || align=right data-sort-value="0.66" | 660 m || 
|-id=177 bgcolor=#E9E9E9
| 529177 ||  || — || September 20, 2009 || Kitt Peak || Spacewatch ||  || align=right | 1.5 km || 
|-id=178 bgcolor=#E9E9E9
| 529178 ||  || — || August 19, 2009 || La Sagra || OAM Obs. ||  || align=right | 2.1 km || 
|-id=179 bgcolor=#fefefe
| 529179 ||  || — || September 21, 2009 || Kitt Peak || Spacewatch || CLA || align=right | 1.9 km || 
|-id=180 bgcolor=#E9E9E9
| 529180 ||  || — || August 28, 2009 || Catalina || CSS ||  || align=right | 2.2 km || 
|-id=181 bgcolor=#E9E9E9
| 529181 ||  || — || August 17, 2009 || Kitt Peak || Spacewatch ||  || align=right | 1.2 km || 
|-id=182 bgcolor=#E9E9E9
| 529182 ||  || — || September 21, 2009 || Kitt Peak || Spacewatch ||  || align=right | 1.2 km || 
|-id=183 bgcolor=#E9E9E9
| 529183 ||  || — || September 21, 2009 || Kitt Peak || Spacewatch ||  || align=right | 1.7 km || 
|-id=184 bgcolor=#E9E9E9
| 529184 ||  || — || September 22, 2009 || Kitt Peak || Spacewatch ||  || align=right data-sort-value="0.63" | 630 m || 
|-id=185 bgcolor=#E9E9E9
| 529185 ||  || — || September 19, 2009 || Kitt Peak || Spacewatch ||  || align=right | 1.3 km || 
|-id=186 bgcolor=#E9E9E9
| 529186 ||  || — || September 22, 2009 || Kitt Peak || Spacewatch || NEM || align=right | 2.0 km || 
|-id=187 bgcolor=#E9E9E9
| 529187 ||  || — || September 18, 2009 || Kitt Peak || Spacewatch ||  || align=right | 3.2 km || 
|-id=188 bgcolor=#E9E9E9
| 529188 ||  || — || September 15, 2009 || Kitt Peak || Spacewatch ||  || align=right | 1.6 km || 
|-id=189 bgcolor=#FA8072
| 529189 ||  || — || September 15, 2009 || Kitt Peak || Spacewatch ||  || align=right | 1.3 km || 
|-id=190 bgcolor=#E9E9E9
| 529190 ||  || — || September 23, 2009 || Kitt Peak || Spacewatch ||  || align=right | 1.0 km || 
|-id=191 bgcolor=#E9E9E9
| 529191 ||  || — || December 27, 2005 || Mount Lemmon || Mount Lemmon Survey ||  || align=right | 1.6 km || 
|-id=192 bgcolor=#d6d6d6
| 529192 ||  || — || September 24, 2009 || Kitt Peak || Spacewatch ||  || align=right | 2.4 km || 
|-id=193 bgcolor=#fefefe
| 529193 ||  || — || November 27, 2006 || Mount Lemmon || Mount Lemmon Survey ||  || align=right data-sort-value="0.85" | 850 m || 
|-id=194 bgcolor=#E9E9E9
| 529194 ||  || — || September 18, 2009 || Catalina || CSS || (1547) || align=right | 1.2 km || 
|-id=195 bgcolor=#E9E9E9
| 529195 ||  || — || September 18, 2009 || Mount Lemmon || Mount Lemmon Survey ||  || align=right | 1.3 km || 
|-id=196 bgcolor=#E9E9E9
| 529196 ||  || — || September 18, 2009 || Catalina || CSS ||  || align=right | 1.1 km || 
|-id=197 bgcolor=#E9E9E9
| 529197 ||  || — || September 18, 2009 || Catalina || CSS ||  || align=right | 2.1 km || 
|-id=198 bgcolor=#E9E9E9
| 529198 ||  || — || January 6, 2006 || Kitt Peak || Spacewatch ||  || align=right | 1.4 km || 
|-id=199 bgcolor=#E9E9E9
| 529199 ||  || — || September 20, 2009 || Kitt Peak || Spacewatch ||  || align=right | 1.9 km || 
|-id=200 bgcolor=#E9E9E9
| 529200 ||  || — || December 2, 2005 || Kitt Peak || Spacewatch || NEM || align=right | 1.9 km || 
|}

529201–529300 

|-bgcolor=#E9E9E9
| 529201 ||  || — || September 23, 2009 || Mount Lemmon || Mount Lemmon Survey ||  || align=right | 1.9 km || 
|-id=202 bgcolor=#fefefe
| 529202 ||  || — || September 17, 2009 || Kitt Peak || Spacewatch ||  || align=right data-sort-value="0.75" | 750 m || 
|-id=203 bgcolor=#E9E9E9
| 529203 ||  || — || September 16, 2009 || Kitt Peak || Spacewatch ||  || align=right | 1.4 km || 
|-id=204 bgcolor=#E9E9E9
| 529204 ||  || — || July 29, 2009 || Kitt Peak || Spacewatch || EUN || align=right | 1.0 km || 
|-id=205 bgcolor=#E9E9E9
| 529205 ||  || — || September 17, 2009 || Kitt Peak || Spacewatch || EUN || align=right data-sort-value="0.91" | 910 m || 
|-id=206 bgcolor=#E9E9E9
| 529206 ||  || — || September 17, 2009 || Kitt Peak || Spacewatch ||  || align=right | 1.7 km || 
|-id=207 bgcolor=#E9E9E9
| 529207 ||  || — || September 25, 2009 || Kitt Peak || Spacewatch ||  || align=right | 2.2 km || 
|-id=208 bgcolor=#E9E9E9
| 529208 ||  || — || September 25, 2009 || Kitt Peak || Spacewatch ||  || align=right data-sort-value="0.78" | 780 m || 
|-id=209 bgcolor=#E9E9E9
| 529209 ||  || — || September 25, 2009 || Catalina || CSS ||  || align=right | 2.0 km || 
|-id=210 bgcolor=#E9E9E9
| 529210 ||  || — || September 25, 2009 || Kitt Peak || Spacewatch ||  || align=right | 1.5 km || 
|-id=211 bgcolor=#fefefe
| 529211 ||  || — || August 29, 2009 || Kitt Peak || Spacewatch ||  || align=right data-sort-value="0.69" | 690 m || 
|-id=212 bgcolor=#E9E9E9
| 529212 ||  || — || September 17, 2009 || Kitt Peak || Spacewatch ||  || align=right data-sort-value="0.92" | 920 m || 
|-id=213 bgcolor=#E9E9E9
| 529213 ||  || — || August 20, 2009 || Kitt Peak || Spacewatch || EUN || align=right data-sort-value="0.89" | 890 m || 
|-id=214 bgcolor=#E9E9E9
| 529214 ||  || — || August 18, 2009 || Kitt Peak || Spacewatch ||  || align=right | 1.4 km || 
|-id=215 bgcolor=#d6d6d6
| 529215 ||  || — || September 25, 2009 || Kitt Peak || Spacewatch || EUP || align=right | 3.1 km || 
|-id=216 bgcolor=#E9E9E9
| 529216 ||  || — || September 18, 2009 || Kitt Peak || Spacewatch ||  || align=right | 1.3 km || 
|-id=217 bgcolor=#E9E9E9
| 529217 ||  || — || August 17, 2009 || Kitt Peak || Spacewatch ||  || align=right | 1.8 km || 
|-id=218 bgcolor=#E9E9E9
| 529218 ||  || — || September 24, 2009 || Mount Lemmon || Mount Lemmon Survey ||  || align=right | 1.3 km || 
|-id=219 bgcolor=#E9E9E9
| 529219 ||  || — || September 26, 2009 || Kitt Peak || Spacewatch ||  || align=right | 1.5 km || 
|-id=220 bgcolor=#fefefe
| 529220 ||  || — || September 20, 2009 || Kitt Peak || Spacewatch ||  || align=right | 1.7 km || 
|-id=221 bgcolor=#E9E9E9
| 529221 ||  || — || September 25, 2009 || Kitt Peak || Spacewatch || MIS || align=right | 1.9 km || 
|-id=222 bgcolor=#d6d6d6
| 529222 ||  || — || September 19, 2009 || Kitt Peak || Spacewatch ||  || align=right | 2.4 km || 
|-id=223 bgcolor=#E9E9E9
| 529223 ||  || — || September 19, 2009 || Kitt Peak || Spacewatch ||  || align=right data-sort-value="0.88" | 880 m || 
|-id=224 bgcolor=#E9E9E9
| 529224 ||  || — || September 17, 2009 || Mount Lemmon || Mount Lemmon Survey ||  || align=right | 1.6 km || 
|-id=225 bgcolor=#E9E9E9
| 529225 ||  || — || September 26, 2009 || Catalina || CSS ||  || align=right | 1.3 km || 
|-id=226 bgcolor=#d6d6d6
| 529226 ||  || — || September 25, 2009 || Kitt Peak || Spacewatch || Tj (2.99) || align=right | 4.2 km || 
|-id=227 bgcolor=#fefefe
| 529227 ||  || — || September 17, 2009 || Kitt Peak || Spacewatch || critical || align=right data-sort-value="0.68" | 680 m || 
|-id=228 bgcolor=#fefefe
| 529228 ||  || — || September 26, 2009 || Kitt Peak || Spacewatch ||  || align=right data-sort-value="0.68" | 680 m || 
|-id=229 bgcolor=#E9E9E9
| 529229 ||  || — || September 26, 2009 || Kitt Peak || Spacewatch ||  || align=right | 2.5 km || 
|-id=230 bgcolor=#E9E9E9
| 529230 ||  || — || September 30, 2009 || Mount Lemmon || Mount Lemmon Survey ||  || align=right | 2.3 km || 
|-id=231 bgcolor=#E9E9E9
| 529231 ||  || — || February 21, 2007 || Kitt Peak || Spacewatch ||  || align=right | 1.2 km || 
|-id=232 bgcolor=#E9E9E9
| 529232 ||  || — || November 26, 2005 || Mount Lemmon || Mount Lemmon Survey ||  || align=right | 1.1 km || 
|-id=233 bgcolor=#E9E9E9
| 529233 ||  || — || September 18, 2009 || Kitt Peak || Spacewatch ||  || align=right | 2.0 km || 
|-id=234 bgcolor=#E9E9E9
| 529234 ||  || — || September 19, 2009 || Mount Lemmon || Mount Lemmon Survey ||  || align=right | 2.0 km || 
|-id=235 bgcolor=#fefefe
| 529235 ||  || — || September 22, 2009 || Kitt Peak || Spacewatch ||  || align=right data-sort-value="0.83" | 830 m || 
|-id=236 bgcolor=#E9E9E9
| 529236 ||  || — || April 7, 2007 || Mount Lemmon || Mount Lemmon Survey ||  || align=right | 2.3 km || 
|-id=237 bgcolor=#E9E9E9
| 529237 ||  || — || September 20, 2009 || Kitt Peak || Spacewatch ||  || align=right data-sort-value="0.69" | 690 m || 
|-id=238 bgcolor=#E9E9E9
| 529238 ||  || — || September 22, 2009 || Kitt Peak || Spacewatch ||  || align=right | 2.0 km || 
|-id=239 bgcolor=#E9E9E9
| 529239 ||  || — || March 14, 2007 || Mount Lemmon || Mount Lemmon Survey ||  || align=right | 1.5 km || 
|-id=240 bgcolor=#d6d6d6
| 529240 ||  || — || October 12, 2009 || La Sagra || OAM Obs. || Tj (2.98) || align=right | 4.1 km || 
|-id=241 bgcolor=#E9E9E9
| 529241 ||  || — || September 29, 2009 || Mount Lemmon || Mount Lemmon Survey ||  || align=right | 1.8 km || 
|-id=242 bgcolor=#fefefe
| 529242 ||  || — || October 12, 2009 || Mount Lemmon || Mount Lemmon Survey || H || align=right data-sort-value="0.41" | 410 m || 
|-id=243 bgcolor=#E9E9E9
| 529243 ||  || — || September 20, 2009 || Mount Lemmon || Mount Lemmon Survey ||  || align=right | 1.6 km || 
|-id=244 bgcolor=#E9E9E9
| 529244 ||  || — || October 1, 2009 || Mount Lemmon || Mount Lemmon Survey ||  || align=right | 1.5 km || 
|-id=245 bgcolor=#E9E9E9
| 529245 ||  || — || October 27, 2005 || Kitt Peak || Spacewatch ||  || align=right data-sort-value="0.68" | 680 m || 
|-id=246 bgcolor=#E9E9E9
| 529246 ||  || — || October 11, 2009 || La Sagra || OAM Obs. ||  || align=right | 3.3 km || 
|-id=247 bgcolor=#E9E9E9
| 529247 ||  || — || October 11, 2009 || La Sagra || OAM Obs. ||  || align=right | 2.6 km || 
|-id=248 bgcolor=#E9E9E9
| 529248 ||  || — || September 16, 2009 || Kitt Peak || Spacewatch ||  || align=right | 2.0 km || 
|-id=249 bgcolor=#E9E9E9
| 529249 ||  || — || October 14, 2009 || Mount Lemmon || Mount Lemmon Survey ||  || align=right | 1.1 km || 
|-id=250 bgcolor=#E9E9E9
| 529250 ||  || — || September 18, 2009 || Kitt Peak || Spacewatch ||  || align=right | 2.0 km || 
|-id=251 bgcolor=#E9E9E9
| 529251 ||  || — || October 14, 2009 || La Sagra || OAM Obs. ||  || align=right | 2.0 km || 
|-id=252 bgcolor=#E9E9E9
| 529252 ||  || — || August 15, 2009 || Kitt Peak || Spacewatch ||  || align=right | 1.6 km || 
|-id=253 bgcolor=#E9E9E9
| 529253 ||  || — || September 18, 2009 || Kitt Peak || Spacewatch ||  || align=right | 1.7 km || 
|-id=254 bgcolor=#E9E9E9
| 529254 ||  || — || September 27, 2009 || Kitt Peak || Spacewatch ||  || align=right | 1.6 km || 
|-id=255 bgcolor=#E9E9E9
| 529255 ||  || — || October 9, 2009 || Catalina || CSS ||  || align=right | 1.3 km || 
|-id=256 bgcolor=#E9E9E9
| 529256 ||  || — || October 15, 2009 || Socorro || LINEAR ||  || align=right | 2.7 km || 
|-id=257 bgcolor=#d6d6d6
| 529257 ||  || — || October 11, 2009 || Mount Lemmon || Mount Lemmon Survey || 7:4 || align=right | 2.8 km || 
|-id=258 bgcolor=#E9E9E9
| 529258 ||  || — || October 16, 2009 || Catalina || CSS || JUN || align=right data-sort-value="0.90" | 900 m || 
|-id=259 bgcolor=#E9E9E9
| 529259 ||  || — || September 27, 2009 || Catalina || CSS ||  || align=right | 1.4 km || 
|-id=260 bgcolor=#E9E9E9
| 529260 ||  || — || September 17, 2009 || Kitt Peak || Spacewatch ||  || align=right | 1.2 km || 
|-id=261 bgcolor=#E9E9E9
| 529261 ||  || — || September 21, 2009 || Mount Lemmon || Mount Lemmon Survey ||  || align=right | 1.4 km || 
|-id=262 bgcolor=#FA8072
| 529262 ||  || — || September 18, 2009 || Mount Lemmon || Mount Lemmon Survey ||  || align=right data-sort-value="0.74" | 740 m || 
|-id=263 bgcolor=#E9E9E9
| 529263 ||  || — || October 21, 2009 || Catalina || CSS ||  || align=right | 2.2 km || 
|-id=264 bgcolor=#E9E9E9
| 529264 ||  || — || October 18, 2009 || Mount Lemmon || Mount Lemmon Survey ||  || align=right | 1.3 km || 
|-id=265 bgcolor=#E9E9E9
| 529265 ||  || — || October 21, 2009 || Mount Lemmon || Mount Lemmon Survey ||  || align=right | 1.4 km || 
|-id=266 bgcolor=#E9E9E9
| 529266 ||  || — || October 22, 2009 || Mount Lemmon || Mount Lemmon Survey ||  || align=right | 1.5 km || 
|-id=267 bgcolor=#d6d6d6
| 529267 ||  || — || September 19, 2009 || Mount Lemmon || Mount Lemmon Survey ||  || align=right | 2.6 km || 
|-id=268 bgcolor=#E9E9E9
| 529268 ||  || — || October 22, 2009 || Mount Lemmon || Mount Lemmon Survey ||  || align=right | 2.0 km || 
|-id=269 bgcolor=#E9E9E9
| 529269 ||  || — || October 22, 2009 || Mount Lemmon || Mount Lemmon Survey ||  || align=right | 1.8 km || 
|-id=270 bgcolor=#d6d6d6
| 529270 ||  || — || August 29, 2009 || Kitt Peak || Spacewatch ||  || align=right | 2.7 km || 
|-id=271 bgcolor=#E9E9E9
| 529271 ||  || — || September 15, 2009 || Kitt Peak || Spacewatch ||  || align=right | 1.9 km || 
|-id=272 bgcolor=#E9E9E9
| 529272 ||  || — || September 17, 2009 || Mount Lemmon || Mount Lemmon Survey ||  || align=right | 2.3 km || 
|-id=273 bgcolor=#E9E9E9
| 529273 ||  || — || October 19, 2009 || Kitt Peak || Spacewatch ||  || align=right | 1.9 km || 
|-id=274 bgcolor=#E9E9E9
| 529274 ||  || — || September 19, 2009 || Kitt Peak || Spacewatch ||  || align=right | 1.5 km || 
|-id=275 bgcolor=#E9E9E9
| 529275 ||  || — || October 17, 2009 || Mount Lemmon || Mount Lemmon Survey || MAR || align=right data-sort-value="0.84" | 840 m || 
|-id=276 bgcolor=#E9E9E9
| 529276 ||  || — || September 21, 2009 || Kitt Peak || Spacewatch ||  || align=right | 1.6 km || 
|-id=277 bgcolor=#E9E9E9
| 529277 ||  || — || October 23, 2009 || Mount Lemmon || Mount Lemmon Survey ||  || align=right | 1.4 km || 
|-id=278 bgcolor=#E9E9E9
| 529278 ||  || — || September 22, 2009 || Mount Lemmon || Mount Lemmon Survey ||  || align=right | 1.9 km || 
|-id=279 bgcolor=#E9E9E9
| 529279 ||  || — || September 16, 2009 || Kitt Peak || Spacewatch ||  || align=right | 1.5 km || 
|-id=280 bgcolor=#E9E9E9
| 529280 ||  || — || October 21, 2009 || Mount Lemmon || Mount Lemmon Survey ||  || align=right | 1.2 km || 
|-id=281 bgcolor=#E9E9E9
| 529281 ||  || — || October 23, 2009 || Mount Lemmon || Mount Lemmon Survey ||  || align=right | 1.5 km || 
|-id=282 bgcolor=#E9E9E9
| 529282 ||  || — || October 18, 2009 || La Sagra || OAM Obs. ||  || align=right | 1.9 km || 
|-id=283 bgcolor=#E9E9E9
| 529283 ||  || — || October 18, 2009 || Catalina || CSS ||  || align=right | 1.6 km || 
|-id=284 bgcolor=#E9E9E9
| 529284 ||  || — || September 20, 2009 || Catalina || CSS ||  || align=right | 2.2 km || 
|-id=285 bgcolor=#E9E9E9
| 529285 ||  || — || September 28, 2009 || Kitt Peak || Spacewatch ||  || align=right | 1.8 km || 
|-id=286 bgcolor=#E9E9E9
| 529286 ||  || — || September 21, 2009 || Mount Lemmon || Mount Lemmon Survey ||  || align=right | 2.0 km || 
|-id=287 bgcolor=#E9E9E9
| 529287 ||  || — || October 23, 2009 || Mount Lemmon || Mount Lemmon Survey ||  || align=right | 1.2 km || 
|-id=288 bgcolor=#E9E9E9
| 529288 ||  || — || September 28, 2009 || Mount Lemmon || Mount Lemmon Survey ||  || align=right | 2.6 km || 
|-id=289 bgcolor=#E9E9E9
| 529289 ||  || — || October 25, 2009 || Catalina || CSS || ADE || align=right | 1.8 km || 
|-id=290 bgcolor=#E9E9E9
| 529290 ||  || — || October 23, 2009 || Kitt Peak || Spacewatch ||  || align=right | 1.9 km || 
|-id=291 bgcolor=#E9E9E9
| 529291 ||  || — || October 23, 2009 || Kitt Peak || Spacewatch ||  || align=right | 1.8 km || 
|-id=292 bgcolor=#E9E9E9
| 529292 ||  || — || October 24, 2009 || Kitt Peak || Spacewatch ||  || align=right | 1.9 km || 
|-id=293 bgcolor=#E9E9E9
| 529293 ||  || — || September 19, 2009 || Mount Lemmon || Mount Lemmon Survey || HOF || align=right | 2.8 km || 
|-id=294 bgcolor=#E9E9E9
| 529294 ||  || — || October 25, 2009 || Kitt Peak || Spacewatch ||  || align=right | 2.7 km || 
|-id=295 bgcolor=#E9E9E9
| 529295 ||  || — || December 25, 2005 || Kitt Peak || Spacewatch ||  || align=right | 1.5 km || 
|-id=296 bgcolor=#E9E9E9
| 529296 ||  || — || October 23, 2009 || Mount Lemmon || Mount Lemmon Survey ||  || align=right | 1.1 km || 
|-id=297 bgcolor=#E9E9E9
| 529297 ||  || — || October 14, 2009 || Catalina || CSS ||  || align=right | 2.3 km || 
|-id=298 bgcolor=#E9E9E9
| 529298 ||  || — || September 15, 2009 || Kitt Peak || Spacewatch ||  || align=right | 1.4 km || 
|-id=299 bgcolor=#E9E9E9
| 529299 ||  || — || September 29, 2009 || Mount Lemmon || Mount Lemmon Survey ||  || align=right | 1.9 km || 
|-id=300 bgcolor=#E9E9E9
| 529300 ||  || — || October 15, 2009 || La Sagra || OAM Obs. ||  || align=right | 2.5 km || 
|}

529301–529400 

|-bgcolor=#E9E9E9
| 529301 ||  || — || October 13, 2009 || La Sagra || OAM Obs. ||  || align=right | 1.7 km || 
|-id=302 bgcolor=#E9E9E9
| 529302 ||  || — || April 4, 2003 || Kitt Peak || Spacewatch ||  || align=right | 2.7 km || 
|-id=303 bgcolor=#E9E9E9
| 529303 ||  || — || October 18, 2009 || La Sagra || OAM Obs. ||  || align=right | 1.4 km || 
|-id=304 bgcolor=#E9E9E9
| 529304 ||  || — || September 29, 2009 || Mount Lemmon || Mount Lemmon Survey ||  || align=right | 1.5 km || 
|-id=305 bgcolor=#E9E9E9
| 529305 ||  || — || September 29, 2009 || Mount Lemmon || Mount Lemmon Survey ||  || align=right | 1.5 km || 
|-id=306 bgcolor=#E9E9E9
| 529306 ||  || — || October 26, 2009 || Kitt Peak || Spacewatch ||  || align=right | 1.4 km || 
|-id=307 bgcolor=#fefefe
| 529307 ||  || — || October 22, 2009 || Mount Lemmon || Mount Lemmon Survey ||  || align=right data-sort-value="0.87" | 870 m || 
|-id=308 bgcolor=#E9E9E9
| 529308 ||  || — || October 22, 2009 || Mount Lemmon || Mount Lemmon Survey ||  || align=right | 1.8 km || 
|-id=309 bgcolor=#E9E9E9
| 529309 ||  || — || October 18, 2009 || Mount Lemmon || Mount Lemmon Survey ||  || align=right | 1.7 km || 
|-id=310 bgcolor=#E9E9E9
| 529310 ||  || — || October 23, 2009 || Mount Lemmon || Mount Lemmon Survey ||  || align=right | 1.4 km || 
|-id=311 bgcolor=#d6d6d6
| 529311 ||  || — || October 22, 2009 || Mount Lemmon || Mount Lemmon Survey ||  || align=right | 2.4 km || 
|-id=312 bgcolor=#d6d6d6
| 529312 ||  || — || September 30, 2010 || Mount Lemmon || Mount Lemmon Survey || 3:2 || align=right | 4.0 km || 
|-id=313 bgcolor=#E9E9E9
| 529313 ||  || — || September 25, 1995 || Kitt Peak || Spacewatch ||  || align=right | 1.5 km || 
|-id=314 bgcolor=#E9E9E9
| 529314 ||  || — || October 23, 2009 || Kitt Peak || Spacewatch ||  || align=right | 1.8 km || 
|-id=315 bgcolor=#E9E9E9
| 529315 ||  || — || October 24, 2009 || Kitt Peak || Spacewatch ||  || align=right data-sort-value="0.58" | 580 m || 
|-id=316 bgcolor=#E9E9E9
| 529316 ||  || — || October 18, 2009 || Mount Lemmon || Mount Lemmon Survey ||  || align=right | 1.2 km || 
|-id=317 bgcolor=#E9E9E9
| 529317 ||  || — || November 9, 2009 || Socorro || LINEAR ||  || align=right | 1.9 km || 
|-id=318 bgcolor=#E9E9E9
| 529318 ||  || — || June 24, 2009 || Mount Lemmon || Mount Lemmon Survey || (1547) || align=right | 1.5 km || 
|-id=319 bgcolor=#E9E9E9
| 529319 ||  || — || December 5, 2005 || Mount Lemmon || Mount Lemmon Survey ||  || align=right | 1.8 km || 
|-id=320 bgcolor=#E9E9E9
| 529320 ||  || — || October 24, 2009 || Kitt Peak || Spacewatch ||  || align=right | 1.0 km || 
|-id=321 bgcolor=#E9E9E9
| 529321 ||  || — || November 8, 2009 || Mount Lemmon || Mount Lemmon Survey ||  || align=right | 1.7 km || 
|-id=322 bgcolor=#E9E9E9
| 529322 ||  || — || September 18, 2009 || Mount Lemmon || Mount Lemmon Survey ||  || align=right | 1.2 km || 
|-id=323 bgcolor=#E9E9E9
| 529323 ||  || — || September 30, 2009 || Mount Lemmon || Mount Lemmon Survey ||  || align=right | 1.3 km || 
|-id=324 bgcolor=#E9E9E9
| 529324 ||  || — || October 24, 2009 || Catalina || CSS ||  || align=right | 1.2 km || 
|-id=325 bgcolor=#E9E9E9
| 529325 ||  || — || October 14, 2009 || La Sagra || OAM Obs. ||  || align=right | 2.5 km || 
|-id=326 bgcolor=#E9E9E9
| 529326 ||  || — || November 8, 2009 || Kitt Peak || Spacewatch ||  || align=right | 1.4 km || 
|-id=327 bgcolor=#E9E9E9
| 529327 ||  || — || November 10, 2009 || Mount Lemmon || Mount Lemmon Survey ||  || align=right | 1.5 km || 
|-id=328 bgcolor=#E9E9E9
| 529328 ||  || — || October 23, 2009 || Kitt Peak || Spacewatch ||  || align=right | 1.7 km || 
|-id=329 bgcolor=#E9E9E9
| 529329 ||  || — || September 27, 2009 || Socorro || LINEAR ||  || align=right | 1.7 km || 
|-id=330 bgcolor=#E9E9E9
| 529330 ||  || — || November 8, 2009 || Kitt Peak || Spacewatch ||  || align=right | 2.3 km || 
|-id=331 bgcolor=#d6d6d6
| 529331 ||  || — || November 10, 2009 || Kitt Peak || Spacewatch ||  || align=right | 2.5 km || 
|-id=332 bgcolor=#E9E9E9
| 529332 ||  || — || November 11, 2009 || Kitt Peak || Spacewatch ||  || align=right data-sort-value="0.63" | 630 m || 
|-id=333 bgcolor=#E9E9E9
| 529333 ||  || — || September 23, 2009 || Mount Lemmon || Mount Lemmon Survey ||  || align=right | 1.5 km || 
|-id=334 bgcolor=#E9E9E9
| 529334 ||  || — || November 9, 2009 || Catalina || CSS ||  || align=right | 2.0 km || 
|-id=335 bgcolor=#E9E9E9
| 529335 ||  || — || September 19, 2009 || Mount Lemmon || Mount Lemmon Survey ||  || align=right | 1.4 km || 
|-id=336 bgcolor=#E9E9E9
| 529336 ||  || — || November 8, 2009 || Kitt Peak || Spacewatch ||  || align=right | 1.2 km || 
|-id=337 bgcolor=#E9E9E9
| 529337 ||  || — || November 8, 2009 || Kitt Peak || Spacewatch ||  || align=right | 1.3 km || 
|-id=338 bgcolor=#E9E9E9
| 529338 ||  || — || November 9, 2009 || Kitt Peak || Spacewatch ||  || align=right data-sort-value="0.71" | 710 m || 
|-id=339 bgcolor=#E9E9E9
| 529339 ||  || — || November 9, 2009 || Kitt Peak || Spacewatch ||  || align=right | 1.1 km || 
|-id=340 bgcolor=#E9E9E9
| 529340 ||  || — || September 25, 2009 || Catalina || CSS ||  || align=right | 1.7 km || 
|-id=341 bgcolor=#E9E9E9
| 529341 ||  || — || October 27, 2009 || Kitt Peak || Spacewatch ||  || align=right | 1.6 km || 
|-id=342 bgcolor=#E9E9E9
| 529342 ||  || — || September 18, 2009 || Mount Lemmon || Mount Lemmon Survey ||  || align=right | 1.3 km || 
|-id=343 bgcolor=#E9E9E9
| 529343 ||  || — || October 15, 2009 || La Sagra || OAM Obs. ||  || align=right | 3.2 km || 
|-id=344 bgcolor=#E9E9E9
| 529344 ||  || — || January 25, 2006 || Kitt Peak || Spacewatch ||  || align=right | 2.2 km || 
|-id=345 bgcolor=#E9E9E9
| 529345 ||  || — || November 9, 2009 || Catalina || CSS ||  || align=right | 2.0 km || 
|-id=346 bgcolor=#E9E9E9
| 529346 ||  || — || November 10, 2009 || Catalina || CSS ||  || align=right | 2.3 km || 
|-id=347 bgcolor=#E9E9E9
| 529347 ||  || — || September 23, 2009 || Mount Lemmon || Mount Lemmon Survey || JUN || align=right data-sort-value="0.94" | 940 m || 
|-id=348 bgcolor=#E9E9E9
| 529348 ||  || — || October 23, 2009 || Mount Lemmon || Mount Lemmon Survey ||  || align=right | 1.8 km || 
|-id=349 bgcolor=#E9E9E9
| 529349 ||  || — || October 26, 2009 || Kitt Peak || Spacewatch ||  || align=right | 1.6 km || 
|-id=350 bgcolor=#E9E9E9
| 529350 ||  || — || September 16, 2009 || Catalina || CSS ||  || align=right | 1.9 km || 
|-id=351 bgcolor=#E9E9E9
| 529351 ||  || — || October 12, 2009 || Mount Lemmon || Mount Lemmon Survey ||  || align=right | 1.2 km || 
|-id=352 bgcolor=#E9E9E9
| 529352 ||  || — || October 22, 2009 || Mount Lemmon || Mount Lemmon Survey ||  || align=right | 1.5 km || 
|-id=353 bgcolor=#E9E9E9
| 529353 ||  || — || October 26, 2009 || Kitt Peak || Spacewatch ||  || align=right | 1.5 km || 
|-id=354 bgcolor=#E9E9E9
| 529354 ||  || — || November 11, 2009 || Mount Lemmon || Mount Lemmon Survey ||  || align=right | 2.1 km || 
|-id=355 bgcolor=#E9E9E9
| 529355 ||  || — || October 12, 2009 || Mount Lemmon || Mount Lemmon Survey ||  || align=right | 1.9 km || 
|-id=356 bgcolor=#E9E9E9
| 529356 ||  || — || September 29, 2009 || Mount Lemmon || Mount Lemmon Survey ||  || align=right | 2.5 km || 
|-id=357 bgcolor=#E9E9E9
| 529357 ||  || — || January 2, 2006 || Mount Lemmon || Mount Lemmon Survey ||  || align=right | 2.6 km || 
|-id=358 bgcolor=#E9E9E9
| 529358 ||  || — || October 25, 2009 || Kitt Peak || Spacewatch ||  || align=right | 3.1 km || 
|-id=359 bgcolor=#E9E9E9
| 529359 ||  || — || October 21, 2009 || Mount Lemmon || Mount Lemmon Survey ||  || align=right | 2.5 km || 
|-id=360 bgcolor=#E9E9E9
| 529360 ||  || — || November 11, 2009 || Kitt Peak || Spacewatch ||  || align=right | 1.4 km || 
|-id=361 bgcolor=#E9E9E9
| 529361 ||  || — || November 10, 2009 || Kitt Peak || Spacewatch ||  || align=right | 2.1 km || 
|-id=362 bgcolor=#E9E9E9
| 529362 ||  || — || November 10, 2009 || Mount Lemmon || Mount Lemmon Survey ||  || align=right | 2.8 km || 
|-id=363 bgcolor=#E9E9E9
| 529363 ||  || — || November 8, 2009 || Mount Lemmon || Mount Lemmon Survey ||  || align=right | 2.2 km || 
|-id=364 bgcolor=#E9E9E9
| 529364 ||  || — || December 1, 2005 || Mount Lemmon || Mount Lemmon Survey ||  || align=right | 1.4 km || 
|-id=365 bgcolor=#E9E9E9
| 529365 ||  || — || November 10, 2009 || Kitt Peak || Spacewatch ||  || align=right data-sort-value="0.68" | 680 m || 
|-id=366 bgcolor=#FFC2E0
| 529366 ||  || — || November 17, 2009 || Catalina || CSS || APOPHA || align=right data-sort-value="0.30" | 300 m || 
|-id=367 bgcolor=#E9E9E9
| 529367 ||  || — || November 16, 2009 || Mount Lemmon || Mount Lemmon Survey ||  || align=right | 1.1 km || 
|-id=368 bgcolor=#E9E9E9
| 529368 ||  || — || November 16, 2009 || Mount Lemmon || Mount Lemmon Survey || AGN || align=right | 1.1 km || 
|-id=369 bgcolor=#E9E9E9
| 529369 ||  || — || October 27, 2009 || Kitt Peak || Spacewatch ||  || align=right | 1.2 km || 
|-id=370 bgcolor=#E9E9E9
| 529370 ||  || — || November 16, 2009 || Kitt Peak || Spacewatch ||  || align=right | 1.4 km || 
|-id=371 bgcolor=#E9E9E9
| 529371 ||  || — || November 16, 2009 || Kitt Peak || Spacewatch || MAR || align=right data-sort-value="0.63" | 630 m || 
|-id=372 bgcolor=#fefefe
| 529372 ||  || — || July 1, 2005 || Kitt Peak || Spacewatch ||  || align=right data-sort-value="0.93" | 930 m || 
|-id=373 bgcolor=#E9E9E9
| 529373 ||  || — || November 9, 2009 || Kitt Peak || Spacewatch ||  || align=right | 1.8 km || 
|-id=374 bgcolor=#E9E9E9
| 529374 ||  || — || November 17, 2009 || Kitt Peak || Spacewatch ||  || align=right | 1.7 km || 
|-id=375 bgcolor=#E9E9E9
| 529375 ||  || — || November 18, 2009 || Kitt Peak || Spacewatch || MAR || align=right | 1.3 km || 
|-id=376 bgcolor=#E9E9E9
| 529376 ||  || — || September 19, 2009 || Mount Lemmon || Mount Lemmon Survey ||  || align=right | 2.2 km || 
|-id=377 bgcolor=#E9E9E9
| 529377 ||  || — || October 27, 2009 || Mount Lemmon || Mount Lemmon Survey || JUN || align=right | 1.0 km || 
|-id=378 bgcolor=#E9E9E9
| 529378 ||  || — || October 23, 2009 || Mount Lemmon || Mount Lemmon Survey ||  || align=right | 1.9 km || 
|-id=379 bgcolor=#E9E9E9
| 529379 ||  || — || December 2, 2005 || Kitt Peak || Spacewatch ||  || align=right data-sort-value="0.91" | 910 m || 
|-id=380 bgcolor=#E9E9E9
| 529380 ||  || — || October 23, 2009 || Mount Lemmon || Mount Lemmon Survey ||  || align=right | 1.4 km || 
|-id=381 bgcolor=#E9E9E9
| 529381 ||  || — || October 23, 2009 || Mount Lemmon || Mount Lemmon Survey ||  || align=right | 1.8 km || 
|-id=382 bgcolor=#FA8072
| 529382 ||  || — || November 17, 2009 || Catalina || CSS ||  || align=right | 1.4 km || 
|-id=383 bgcolor=#E9E9E9
| 529383 ||  || — || November 9, 2009 || Mount Lemmon || Mount Lemmon Survey ||  || align=right | 1.6 km || 
|-id=384 bgcolor=#E9E9E9
| 529384 ||  || — || September 19, 2009 || Mount Lemmon || Mount Lemmon Survey ||  || align=right data-sort-value="0.64" | 640 m || 
|-id=385 bgcolor=#E9E9E9
| 529385 ||  || — || October 21, 2009 || Mount Lemmon || Mount Lemmon Survey ||  || align=right | 2.2 km || 
|-id=386 bgcolor=#E9E9E9
| 529386 ||  || — || November 18, 2009 || Kitt Peak || Spacewatch ||  || align=right | 2.2 km || 
|-id=387 bgcolor=#E9E9E9
| 529387 ||  || — || November 18, 2009 || Kitt Peak || Spacewatch ||  || align=right | 1.2 km || 
|-id=388 bgcolor=#FA8072
| 529388 ||  || — || November 10, 2009 || Kitt Peak || Spacewatch ||  || align=right | 1.1 km || 
|-id=389 bgcolor=#E9E9E9
| 529389 ||  || — || November 18, 2009 || Kitt Peak || Spacewatch ||  || align=right | 2.0 km || 
|-id=390 bgcolor=#E9E9E9
| 529390 ||  || — || November 19, 2009 || Kitt Peak || Spacewatch ||  || align=right | 1.6 km || 
|-id=391 bgcolor=#E9E9E9
| 529391 ||  || — || November 11, 2009 || Kitt Peak || Spacewatch ||  || align=right | 2.4 km || 
|-id=392 bgcolor=#d6d6d6
| 529392 ||  || — || November 19, 2009 || Kitt Peak || Spacewatch || (3561)3:2 || align=right | 4.7 km || 
|-id=393 bgcolor=#E9E9E9
| 529393 ||  || — || February 25, 2006 || Kitt Peak || Spacewatch ||  || align=right | 1.6 km || 
|-id=394 bgcolor=#E9E9E9
| 529394 ||  || — || November 19, 2009 || Kitt Peak || Spacewatch ||  || align=right | 1.2 km || 
|-id=395 bgcolor=#E9E9E9
| 529395 ||  || — || November 8, 2009 || Kitt Peak || Spacewatch ||  || align=right | 1.4 km || 
|-id=396 bgcolor=#E9E9E9
| 529396 ||  || — || October 23, 2009 || Mount Lemmon || Mount Lemmon Survey ||  || align=right | 2.3 km || 
|-id=397 bgcolor=#E9E9E9
| 529397 ||  || — || November 10, 2009 || Kitt Peak || Spacewatch ||  || align=right | 1.7 km || 
|-id=398 bgcolor=#E9E9E9
| 529398 ||  || — || November 22, 2009 || Catalina || CSS ||  || align=right | 2.0 km || 
|-id=399 bgcolor=#E9E9E9
| 529399 ||  || — || September 18, 2009 || Kitt Peak || Spacewatch ||  || align=right | 1.3 km || 
|-id=400 bgcolor=#E9E9E9
| 529400 ||  || — || November 8, 2009 || Kitt Peak || Spacewatch ||  || align=right | 2.0 km || 
|}

529401–529500 

|-bgcolor=#E9E9E9
| 529401 ||  || — || November 20, 2009 || Kitt Peak || Spacewatch ||  || align=right | 1.8 km || 
|-id=402 bgcolor=#E9E9E9
| 529402 ||  || — || October 16, 2009 || Mount Lemmon || Mount Lemmon Survey ||  || align=right data-sort-value="0.97" | 970 m || 
|-id=403 bgcolor=#E9E9E9
| 529403 ||  || — || October 26, 2009 || Mount Lemmon || Mount Lemmon Survey ||  || align=right | 2.0 km || 
|-id=404 bgcolor=#E9E9E9
| 529404 ||  || — || November 22, 2009 || Mount Lemmon || Mount Lemmon Survey ||  || align=right data-sort-value="0.75" | 750 m || 
|-id=405 bgcolor=#E9E9E9
| 529405 ||  || — || November 11, 2009 || Kitt Peak || Spacewatch ||  || align=right | 1.5 km || 
|-id=406 bgcolor=#E9E9E9
| 529406 ||  || — || November 11, 2009 || Kitt Peak || Spacewatch || JUN || align=right data-sort-value="0.73" | 730 m || 
|-id=407 bgcolor=#E9E9E9
| 529407 ||  || — || November 19, 2009 || Mount Lemmon || Mount Lemmon Survey ||  || align=right | 1.6 km || 
|-id=408 bgcolor=#E9E9E9
| 529408 ||  || — || March 14, 2007 || Kitt Peak || Spacewatch ||  || align=right | 1.2 km || 
|-id=409 bgcolor=#E9E9E9
| 529409 ||  || — || November 21, 2009 || Kitt Peak || Spacewatch ||  || align=right | 1.8 km || 
|-id=410 bgcolor=#E9E9E9
| 529410 ||  || — || November 8, 2009 || Kitt Peak || Spacewatch ||  || align=right | 2.3 km || 
|-id=411 bgcolor=#E9E9E9
| 529411 ||  || — || November 22, 2009 || Mount Lemmon || Mount Lemmon Survey ||  || align=right | 2.4 km || 
|-id=412 bgcolor=#E9E9E9
| 529412 ||  || — || October 12, 2009 || Mount Lemmon || Mount Lemmon Survey || EUN || align=right data-sort-value="0.96" | 960 m || 
|-id=413 bgcolor=#E9E9E9
| 529413 ||  || — || November 11, 2009 || Kitt Peak || Spacewatch ||  || align=right | 1.8 km || 
|-id=414 bgcolor=#E9E9E9
| 529414 ||  || — || November 23, 2009 || Mount Lemmon || Mount Lemmon Survey ||  || align=right | 1.3 km || 
|-id=415 bgcolor=#E9E9E9
| 529415 ||  || — || October 23, 2009 || Mount Lemmon || Mount Lemmon Survey ||  || align=right | 1.8 km || 
|-id=416 bgcolor=#E9E9E9
| 529416 ||  || — || October 22, 2009 || Mount Lemmon || Mount Lemmon Survey ||  || align=right | 1.8 km || 
|-id=417 bgcolor=#E9E9E9
| 529417 ||  || — || October 21, 1995 || Kitt Peak || Spacewatch ||  || align=right | 1.6 km || 
|-id=418 bgcolor=#E9E9E9
| 529418 ||  || — || November 10, 2009 || Kitt Peak || Spacewatch || DOR || align=right | 2.3 km || 
|-id=419 bgcolor=#E9E9E9
| 529419 ||  || — || June 12, 2008 || Kitt Peak || Spacewatch ||  || align=right | 2.1 km || 
|-id=420 bgcolor=#E9E9E9
| 529420 ||  || — || November 18, 2009 || Mount Lemmon || Mount Lemmon Survey ||  || align=right | 2.3 km || 
|-id=421 bgcolor=#E9E9E9
| 529421 ||  || — || November 16, 2009 || Kitt Peak || Spacewatch ||  || align=right | 1.9 km || 
|-id=422 bgcolor=#E9E9E9
| 529422 ||  || — || December 6, 2005 || Kitt Peak || Spacewatch ||  || align=right | 1.3 km || 
|-id=423 bgcolor=#E9E9E9
| 529423 ||  || — || November 11, 2009 || Socorro || LINEAR ||  || align=right | 1.7 km || 
|-id=424 bgcolor=#E9E9E9
| 529424 ||  || — || September 22, 2009 || Mount Lemmon || Mount Lemmon Survey ||  || align=right | 1.3 km || 
|-id=425 bgcolor=#E9E9E9
| 529425 ||  || — || November 11, 2009 || Socorro || LINEAR ||  || align=right | 3.1 km || 
|-id=426 bgcolor=#E9E9E9
| 529426 ||  || — || November 17, 2009 || Mount Lemmon || Mount Lemmon Survey ||  || align=right | 2.3 km || 
|-id=427 bgcolor=#E9E9E9
| 529427 ||  || — || November 19, 2009 || Kitt Peak || Spacewatch ||  || align=right | 2.1 km || 
|-id=428 bgcolor=#E9E9E9
| 529428 ||  || — || November 10, 2009 || Kitt Peak || Spacewatch || EUN || align=right | 1.2 km || 
|-id=429 bgcolor=#E9E9E9
| 529429 ||  || — || October 15, 2009 || Kitt Peak || Spacewatch ||  || align=right | 1.9 km || 
|-id=430 bgcolor=#E9E9E9
| 529430 ||  || — || November 16, 2009 || Mount Lemmon || Mount Lemmon Survey ||  || align=right | 1.2 km || 
|-id=431 bgcolor=#E9E9E9
| 529431 ||  || — || November 20, 2009 || Kitt Peak || Spacewatch ||  || align=right data-sort-value="0.98" | 980 m || 
|-id=432 bgcolor=#E9E9E9
| 529432 ||  || — || December 10, 2009 || Tzec Maun || Tzec Maun Obs. ||  || align=right | 1.9 km || 
|-id=433 bgcolor=#E9E9E9
| 529433 ||  || — || November 20, 2009 || Mount Lemmon || Mount Lemmon Survey ||  || align=right | 1.1 km || 
|-id=434 bgcolor=#E9E9E9
| 529434 ||  || — || December 15, 2009 || Mount Lemmon || Mount Lemmon Survey || JUN || align=right data-sort-value="0.88" | 880 m || 
|-id=435 bgcolor=#d6d6d6
| 529435 ||  || — || November 16, 2009 || Mount Lemmon || Mount Lemmon Survey ||  || align=right | 2.8 km || 
|-id=436 bgcolor=#E9E9E9
| 529436 ||  || — || December 15, 2009 || Mount Lemmon || Mount Lemmon Survey ||  || align=right | 1.1 km || 
|-id=437 bgcolor=#E9E9E9
| 529437 ||  || — || November 10, 2009 || Catalina || CSS ||  || align=right | 2.5 km || 
|-id=438 bgcolor=#E9E9E9
| 529438 ||  || — || November 23, 2009 || Mount Lemmon || Mount Lemmon Survey ||  || align=right | 2.1 km || 
|-id=439 bgcolor=#E9E9E9
| 529439 ||  || — || December 16, 2009 || Mount Lemmon || Mount Lemmon Survey ||  || align=right | 1.7 km || 
|-id=440 bgcolor=#d6d6d6
| 529440 ||  || — || November 17, 2009 || Mount Lemmon || Mount Lemmon Survey ||  || align=right | 4.3 km || 
|-id=441 bgcolor=#E9E9E9
| 529441 ||  || — || November 10, 2004 || Kitt Peak || Spacewatch ||  || align=right | 2.5 km || 
|-id=442 bgcolor=#E9E9E9
| 529442 ||  || — || December 18, 2009 || Mount Lemmon || Mount Lemmon Survey || (1547) || align=right | 1.9 km || 
|-id=443 bgcolor=#E9E9E9
| 529443 ||  || — || December 18, 2009 || Kitt Peak || Spacewatch ||  || align=right | 1.6 km || 
|-id=444 bgcolor=#E9E9E9
| 529444 ||  || — || December 19, 2009 || Kitt Peak || Spacewatch ||  || align=right | 3.7 km || 
|-id=445 bgcolor=#E9E9E9
| 529445 ||  || — || December 18, 2009 || Kitt Peak || Spacewatch ||  || align=right | 2.4 km || 
|-id=446 bgcolor=#E9E9E9
| 529446 ||  || — || December 19, 2009 || Kitt Peak || Spacewatch ||  || align=right | 2.0 km || 
|-id=447 bgcolor=#E9E9E9
| 529447 ||  || — || November 17, 2009 || Mount Lemmon || Mount Lemmon Survey ||  || align=right | 1.3 km || 
|-id=448 bgcolor=#E9E9E9
| 529448 ||  || — || December 18, 2009 || Kitt Peak || Spacewatch ||  || align=right | 1.8 km || 
|-id=449 bgcolor=#d6d6d6
| 529449 ||  || — || October 24, 2003 || Kitt Peak || Spacewatch ||  || align=right | 3.6 km || 
|-id=450 bgcolor=#FFC2E0
| 529450 ||  || — || January 6, 2010 || Kitt Peak || Spacewatch || APO || align=right data-sort-value="0.49" | 490 m || 
|-id=451 bgcolor=#E9E9E9
| 529451 ||  || — || January 4, 2010 || Kitt Peak || Spacewatch ||  || align=right | 1.3 km || 
|-id=452 bgcolor=#E9E9E9
| 529452 ||  || — || December 17, 2009 || Mount Lemmon || Mount Lemmon Survey ||  || align=right | 1.9 km || 
|-id=453 bgcolor=#fefefe
| 529453 ||  || — || December 25, 2009 || Kitt Peak || Spacewatch ||  || align=right data-sort-value="0.97" | 970 m || 
|-id=454 bgcolor=#E9E9E9
| 529454 ||  || — || January 6, 2010 || Kitt Peak || Spacewatch ||  || align=right | 1.3 km || 
|-id=455 bgcolor=#E9E9E9
| 529455 ||  || — || January 7, 2010 || Kitt Peak || Spacewatch ||  || align=right | 1.8 km || 
|-id=456 bgcolor=#d6d6d6
| 529456 ||  || — || January 5, 2010 || Sierra Stars || Sierra Stars Obs. || Tj (2.86) || align=right | 4.0 km || 
|-id=457 bgcolor=#E9E9E9
| 529457 ||  || — || December 20, 2009 || Mount Lemmon || Mount Lemmon Survey ||  || align=right | 1.3 km || 
|-id=458 bgcolor=#E9E9E9
| 529458 ||  || — || December 18, 2009 || Mount Lemmon || Mount Lemmon Survey ||  || align=right data-sort-value="0.96" | 960 m || 
|-id=459 bgcolor=#E9E9E9
| 529459 ||  || — || January 8, 2010 || Kitt Peak || Spacewatch ||  || align=right data-sort-value="0.99" | 990 m || 
|-id=460 bgcolor=#E9E9E9
| 529460 ||  || — || January 8, 2010 || Kitt Peak || Spacewatch ||  || align=right | 1.5 km || 
|-id=461 bgcolor=#E9E9E9
| 529461 ||  || — || January 8, 2010 || Kitt Peak || Spacewatch ||  || align=right data-sort-value="0.81" | 810 m || 
|-id=462 bgcolor=#E9E9E9
| 529462 ||  || — || January 8, 2010 || Kitt Peak || Spacewatch ||  || align=right | 1.5 km || 
|-id=463 bgcolor=#E9E9E9
| 529463 ||  || — || January 8, 2010 || Kitt Peak || Spacewatch ||  || align=right | 2.8 km || 
|-id=464 bgcolor=#E9E9E9
| 529464 ||  || — || December 20, 2009 || Kitt Peak || Spacewatch ||  || align=right | 2.1 km || 
|-id=465 bgcolor=#d6d6d6
| 529465 ||  || — || January 10, 2010 || Socorro || LINEAR || unusual || align=right | 3.5 km || 
|-id=466 bgcolor=#E9E9E9
| 529466 ||  || — || December 20, 2009 || Kitt Peak || Spacewatch ||  || align=right | 2.3 km || 
|-id=467 bgcolor=#E9E9E9
| 529467 ||  || — || January 11, 2010 || Kitt Peak || Spacewatch ||  || align=right | 1.5 km || 
|-id=468 bgcolor=#d6d6d6
| 529468 ||  || — || December 10, 2009 || Socorro || LINEAR ||  || align=right | 3.3 km || 
|-id=469 bgcolor=#d6d6d6
| 529469 ||  || — || December 27, 2009 || Kitt Peak || Spacewatch || 3:2 || align=right | 5.0 km || 
|-id=470 bgcolor=#E9E9E9
| 529470 ||  || — || September 16, 2009 || Catalina || CSS ||  || align=right | 2.1 km || 
|-id=471 bgcolor=#E9E9E9
| 529471 ||  || — || December 13, 2006 || Mount Lemmon || Mount Lemmon Survey ||  || align=right | 1.3 km || 
|-id=472 bgcolor=#E9E9E9
| 529472 ||  || — || September 30, 2009 || Mount Lemmon || Mount Lemmon Survey ||  || align=right | 3.3 km || 
|-id=473 bgcolor=#E9E9E9
| 529473 ||  || — || March 9, 2007 || Kitt Peak || Spacewatch ||  || align=right | 2.5 km || 
|-id=474 bgcolor=#d6d6d6
| 529474 ||  || — || January 12, 2010 || WISE || WISE ||  || align=right | 4.7 km || 
|-id=475 bgcolor=#E9E9E9
| 529475 ||  || — || September 16, 2009 || Kitt Peak || Spacewatch ||  || align=right | 2.5 km || 
|-id=476 bgcolor=#d6d6d6
| 529476 ||  || — || January 13, 2010 || WISE || WISE ||  || align=right | 3.4 km || 
|-id=477 bgcolor=#E9E9E9
| 529477 ||  || — || January 13, 2010 || WISE || WISE ||  || align=right | 1.2 km || 
|-id=478 bgcolor=#E9E9E9
| 529478 ||  || — || December 1, 2005 || Kitt Peak || Spacewatch ||  || align=right | 3.5 km || 
|-id=479 bgcolor=#d6d6d6
| 529479 ||  || — || December 30, 2008 || Kitt Peak || Spacewatch ||  || align=right | 3.6 km || 
|-id=480 bgcolor=#d6d6d6
| 529480 ||  || — || January 14, 2010 || WISE || WISE ||  || align=right | 5.1 km || 
|-id=481 bgcolor=#E9E9E9
| 529481 ||  || — || October 2, 2009 || Mount Lemmon || Mount Lemmon Survey ||  || align=right data-sort-value="0.77" | 770 m || 
|-id=482 bgcolor=#d6d6d6
| 529482 ||  || — || January 14, 2010 || WISE || WISE ||  || align=right | 3.2 km || 
|-id=483 bgcolor=#E9E9E9
| 529483 ||  || — || January 11, 2010 || Kitt Peak || Spacewatch ||  || align=right | 2.4 km || 
|-id=484 bgcolor=#E9E9E9
| 529484 ||  || — || January 7, 2010 || Mount Lemmon || Mount Lemmon Survey ||  || align=right | 1.7 km || 
|-id=485 bgcolor=#E9E9E9
| 529485 ||  || — || January 13, 2010 || Mount Lemmon || Mount Lemmon Survey ||  || align=right | 2.0 km || 
|-id=486 bgcolor=#E9E9E9
| 529486 ||  || — || October 28, 1995 || Kitt Peak || Spacewatch ||  || align=right | 1.4 km || 
|-id=487 bgcolor=#E9E9E9
| 529487 ||  || — || January 13, 2010 || WISE || WISE ||  || align=right | 3.0 km || 
|-id=488 bgcolor=#E9E9E9
| 529488 ||  || — || November 12, 2005 || Kitt Peak || Spacewatch ||  || align=right | 1.6 km || 
|-id=489 bgcolor=#d6d6d6
| 529489 ||  || — || January 16, 2010 || WISE || WISE ||  || align=right | 3.9 km || 
|-id=490 bgcolor=#d6d6d6
| 529490 ||  || — || January 16, 2010 || WISE || WISE ||  || align=right | 3.0 km || 
|-id=491 bgcolor=#E9E9E9
| 529491 ||  || — || November 2, 2000 || Kitt Peak || Spacewatch ||  || align=right | 2.2 km || 
|-id=492 bgcolor=#E9E9E9
| 529492 ||  || — || December 5, 2005 || Mount Lemmon || Mount Lemmon Survey ||  || align=right | 1.7 km || 
|-id=493 bgcolor=#E9E9E9
| 529493 ||  || — || October 25, 2009 || Kitt Peak || Spacewatch ||  || align=right | 1.7 km || 
|-id=494 bgcolor=#FA8072
| 529494 ||  || — || September 28, 2000 || Socorro || LINEAR ||  || align=right | 1.2 km || 
|-id=495 bgcolor=#d6d6d6
| 529495 ||  || — || January 18, 2010 || WISE || WISE ||  || align=right | 3.3 km || 
|-id=496 bgcolor=#E9E9E9
| 529496 ||  || — || January 18, 2010 || WISE || WISE ||  || align=right | 2.1 km || 
|-id=497 bgcolor=#E9E9E9
| 529497 ||  || — || January 20, 2010 || WISE || WISE ||  || align=right | 2.3 km || 
|-id=498 bgcolor=#E9E9E9
| 529498 ||  || — || October 25, 2009 || Kitt Peak || Spacewatch ||  || align=right | 2.2 km || 
|-id=499 bgcolor=#E9E9E9
| 529499 ||  || — || January 22, 2010 || WISE || WISE ||  || align=right | 2.5 km || 
|-id=500 bgcolor=#d6d6d6
| 529500 ||  || — || January 24, 2010 || WISE || WISE ||  || align=right | 3.4 km || 
|}

529501–529600 

|-bgcolor=#fefefe
| 529501 ||  || — || December 27, 2006 || Mount Lemmon || Mount Lemmon Survey ||  || align=right | 1.0 km || 
|-id=502 bgcolor=#E9E9E9
| 529502 ||  || — || January 25, 2010 || WISE || WISE ||  || align=right | 2.6 km || 
|-id=503 bgcolor=#E9E9E9
| 529503 ||  || — || January 25, 2010 || WISE || WISE ||  || align=right | 2.3 km || 
|-id=504 bgcolor=#d6d6d6
| 529504 ||  || — || January 27, 2010 || WISE || WISE ||  || align=right | 2.2 km || 
|-id=505 bgcolor=#E9E9E9
| 529505 ||  || — || October 27, 2009 || Mount Lemmon || Mount Lemmon Survey ||  || align=right data-sort-value="0.89" | 890 m || 
|-id=506 bgcolor=#d6d6d6
| 529506 ||  || — || December 30, 2008 || Kitt Peak || Spacewatch ||  || align=right | 3.1 km || 
|-id=507 bgcolor=#E9E9E9
| 529507 ||  || — || January 27, 2010 || WISE || WISE ||  || align=right | 1.9 km || 
|-id=508 bgcolor=#E9E9E9
| 529508 ||  || — || January 27, 2010 || WISE || WISE || ADE || align=right | 2.5 km || 
|-id=509 bgcolor=#d6d6d6
| 529509 ||  || — || January 27, 2010 || WISE || WISE ||  || align=right | 4.4 km || 
|-id=510 bgcolor=#E9E9E9
| 529510 ||  || — || March 16, 2007 || Mount Lemmon || Mount Lemmon Survey ||  || align=right | 1.4 km || 
|-id=511 bgcolor=#d6d6d6
| 529511 ||  || — || December 4, 2008 || Mount Lemmon || Mount Lemmon Survey ||  || align=right | 2.5 km || 
|-id=512 bgcolor=#E9E9E9
| 529512 ||  || — || October 24, 2009 || Kitt Peak || Spacewatch ||  || align=right | 2.2 km || 
|-id=513 bgcolor=#E9E9E9
| 529513 ||  || — || February 27, 1992 || Kitt Peak || Spacewatch ||  || align=right | 1.3 km || 
|-id=514 bgcolor=#E9E9E9
| 529514 ||  || — || February 9, 2010 || Kitt Peak || Spacewatch ||  || align=right | 2.4 km || 
|-id=515 bgcolor=#fefefe
| 529515 ||  || — || February 25, 2007 || Kitt Peak || Spacewatch ||  || align=right | 1.2 km || 
|-id=516 bgcolor=#E9E9E9
| 529516 ||  || — || February 13, 2010 || Mount Lemmon || Mount Lemmon Survey ||  || align=right | 1.8 km || 
|-id=517 bgcolor=#d6d6d6
| 529517 ||  || — || February 13, 2010 || WISE || WISE ||  || align=right | 2.6 km || 
|-id=518 bgcolor=#E9E9E9
| 529518 ||  || — || February 9, 2010 || Mount Lemmon || Mount Lemmon Survey ||  || align=right | 1.6 km || 
|-id=519 bgcolor=#E9E9E9
| 529519 ||  || — || January 12, 2010 || Kitt Peak || Spacewatch ||  || align=right | 1.6 km || 
|-id=520 bgcolor=#fefefe
| 529520 ||  || — || February 13, 2010 || Mount Lemmon || Mount Lemmon Survey ||  || align=right data-sort-value="0.56" | 560 m || 
|-id=521 bgcolor=#E9E9E9
| 529521 ||  || — || September 4, 2008 || Kitt Peak || Spacewatch ||  || align=right | 2.2 km || 
|-id=522 bgcolor=#E9E9E9
| 529522 ||  || — || October 8, 2008 || Kitt Peak || Spacewatch ||  || align=right | 1.7 km || 
|-id=523 bgcolor=#E9E9E9
| 529523 ||  || — || February 14, 2010 || Mount Lemmon || Mount Lemmon Survey ||  || align=right | 2.7 km || 
|-id=524 bgcolor=#d6d6d6
| 529524 ||  || — || February 14, 2010 || Mount Lemmon || Mount Lemmon Survey ||  || align=right | 3.3 km || 
|-id=525 bgcolor=#E9E9E9
| 529525 ||  || — || January 11, 2010 || Kitt Peak || Spacewatch || MRX || align=right data-sort-value="0.73" | 730 m || 
|-id=526 bgcolor=#fefefe
| 529526 ||  || — || February 14, 2010 || Mount Lemmon || Mount Lemmon Survey ||  || align=right data-sort-value="0.50" | 500 m || 
|-id=527 bgcolor=#d6d6d6
| 529527 ||  || — || February 9, 2010 || WISE || WISE || EUP || align=right | 6.6 km || 
|-id=528 bgcolor=#E9E9E9
| 529528 ||  || — || October 24, 2009 || Kitt Peak || Spacewatch ||  || align=right | 3.1 km || 
|-id=529 bgcolor=#d6d6d6
| 529529 ||  || — || February 9, 2010 || Kitt Peak || Spacewatch ||  || align=right | 2.5 km || 
|-id=530 bgcolor=#d6d6d6
| 529530 ||  || — || January 11, 2010 || Mount Lemmon || Mount Lemmon Survey ||  || align=right | 3.3 km || 
|-id=531 bgcolor=#d6d6d6
| 529531 ||  || — || February 15, 2010 || Kitt Peak || Spacewatch ||  || align=right | 3.2 km || 
|-id=532 bgcolor=#E9E9E9
| 529532 ||  || — || February 15, 2010 || Kitt Peak || Spacewatch ||  || align=right | 1.8 km || 
|-id=533 bgcolor=#E9E9E9
| 529533 ||  || — || February 15, 2010 || Mount Lemmon || Mount Lemmon Survey ||  || align=right | 1.3 km || 
|-id=534 bgcolor=#d6d6d6
| 529534 ||  || — || February 14, 2010 || Mount Lemmon || Mount Lemmon Survey ||  || align=right | 3.5 km || 
|-id=535 bgcolor=#E9E9E9
| 529535 ||  || — || February 2, 2006 || Kitt Peak || Spacewatch ||  || align=right | 2.0 km || 
|-id=536 bgcolor=#E9E9E9
| 529536 ||  || — || February 14, 2010 || Kitt Peak || Spacewatch || EUN || align=right | 1.1 km || 
|-id=537 bgcolor=#E9E9E9
| 529537 ||  || — || November 9, 2008 || Mount Lemmon || Mount Lemmon Survey ||  || align=right | 1.6 km || 
|-id=538 bgcolor=#E9E9E9
| 529538 ||  || — || October 29, 2008 || Kitt Peak || Spacewatch ||  || align=right | 1.5 km || 
|-id=539 bgcolor=#d6d6d6
| 529539 ||  || — || January 8, 2010 || Kitt Peak || Spacewatch ||  || align=right | 3.0 km || 
|-id=540 bgcolor=#fefefe
| 529540 ||  || — || February 15, 2010 || Haleakala || Pan-STARRS ||  || align=right data-sort-value="0.67" | 670 m || 
|-id=541 bgcolor=#E9E9E9
| 529541 ||  || — || November 8, 2008 || Kitt Peak || Spacewatch ||  || align=right | 2.6 km || 
|-id=542 bgcolor=#E9E9E9
| 529542 ||  || — || December 4, 2008 || Mount Lemmon || Mount Lemmon Survey ||  || align=right | 2.1 km || 
|-id=543 bgcolor=#E9E9E9
| 529543 ||  || — || October 25, 2009 || Kitt Peak || Spacewatch || (1338) || align=right data-sort-value="0.76" | 760 m || 
|-id=544 bgcolor=#d6d6d6
| 529544 ||  || — || February 13, 2010 || WISE || WISE ||  || align=right | 2.9 km || 
|-id=545 bgcolor=#E9E9E9
| 529545 ||  || — || January 31, 2009 || Mount Lemmon || Mount Lemmon Survey ||  || align=right | 2.9 km || 
|-id=546 bgcolor=#d6d6d6
| 529546 ||  || — || February 9, 2010 || WISE || WISE ||  || align=right | 3.3 km || 
|-id=547 bgcolor=#E9E9E9
| 529547 ||  || — || February 9, 2010 || WISE || WISE ||  || align=right | 1.7 km || 
|-id=548 bgcolor=#d6d6d6
| 529548 ||  || — || January 6, 2010 || Mount Lemmon || Mount Lemmon Survey ||  || align=right | 3.8 km || 
|-id=549 bgcolor=#E9E9E9
| 529549 ||  || — || March 27, 2011 || Kitt Peak || Spacewatch ||  || align=right | 3.0 km || 
|-id=550 bgcolor=#E9E9E9
| 529550 ||  || — || November 16, 2009 || Mount Lemmon || Mount Lemmon Survey ||  || align=right | 2.2 km || 
|-id=551 bgcolor=#E9E9E9
| 529551 ||  || — || February 14, 2010 || Kitt Peak || Spacewatch ||  || align=right | 1.9 km || 
|-id=552 bgcolor=#d6d6d6
| 529552 ||  || — || December 1, 2008 || Mount Lemmon || Mount Lemmon Survey ||  || align=right | 2.8 km || 
|-id=553 bgcolor=#E9E9E9
| 529553 ||  || — || January 11, 2010 || Kitt Peak || Spacewatch ||  || align=right | 1.6 km || 
|-id=554 bgcolor=#d6d6d6
| 529554 ||  || — || February 16, 2010 || WISE || WISE ||  || align=right | 4.3 km || 
|-id=555 bgcolor=#d6d6d6
| 529555 ||  || — || February 16, 2010 || WISE || WISE ||  || align=right | 3.9 km || 
|-id=556 bgcolor=#E9E9E9
| 529556 ||  || — || October 6, 2004 || Kitt Peak || Spacewatch ||  || align=right | 2.1 km || 
|-id=557 bgcolor=#E9E9E9
| 529557 ||  || — || November 9, 2009 || Kitt Peak || Spacewatch ||  || align=right | 2.5 km || 
|-id=558 bgcolor=#E9E9E9
| 529558 ||  || — || February 17, 2010 || Kitt Peak || Spacewatch ||  || align=right | 1.7 km || 
|-id=559 bgcolor=#E9E9E9
| 529559 ||  || — || February 17, 2010 || Kitt Peak || Spacewatch || GEF || align=right | 2.3 km || 
|-id=560 bgcolor=#E9E9E9
| 529560 ||  || — || January 13, 2005 || Kitt Peak || Spacewatch ||  || align=right | 1.5 km || 
|-id=561 bgcolor=#E9E9E9
| 529561 ||  || — || October 22, 2003 || Kitt Peak || Spacewatch ||  || align=right | 2.2 km || 
|-id=562 bgcolor=#d6d6d6
| 529562 ||  || — || February 16, 2010 || Kitt Peak || Spacewatch ||  || align=right | 2.9 km || 
|-id=563 bgcolor=#d6d6d6
| 529563 ||  || — || February 16, 2010 || Mount Lemmon || Mount Lemmon Survey ||  || align=right | 2.1 km || 
|-id=564 bgcolor=#fefefe
| 529564 ||  || — || December 31, 2008 || Kitt Peak || Spacewatch ||  || align=right | 1.6 km || 
|-id=565 bgcolor=#E9E9E9
| 529565 ||  || — || January 8, 2010 || Mount Lemmon || Mount Lemmon Survey ||  || align=right | 2.5 km || 
|-id=566 bgcolor=#d6d6d6
| 529566 ||  || — || February 24, 2010 || WISE || WISE ||  || align=right | 4.1 km || 
|-id=567 bgcolor=#d6d6d6
| 529567 ||  || — || February 27, 2010 || WISE || WISE ||  || align=right | 4.2 km || 
|-id=568 bgcolor=#d6d6d6
| 529568 ||  || — || February 20, 2010 || Kitt Peak || Spacewatch ||  || align=right | 3.0 km || 
|-id=569 bgcolor=#E9E9E9
| 529569 ||  || — || February 18, 2010 || Mount Lemmon || Mount Lemmon Survey ||  || align=right | 1.2 km || 
|-id=570 bgcolor=#E9E9E9
| 529570 ||  || — || February 16, 2010 || Kitt Peak || Spacewatch ||  || align=right | 1.7 km || 
|-id=571 bgcolor=#d6d6d6
| 529571 ||  || — || February 27, 2015 || Haleakala || Pan-STARRS ||  || align=right | 3.2 km || 
|-id=572 bgcolor=#E9E9E9
| 529572 ||  || — || July 2, 1998 || Kitt Peak || Spacewatch ||  || align=right | 2.5 km || 
|-id=573 bgcolor=#E9E9E9
| 529573 ||  || — || December 8, 2009 || La Sagra || OAM Obs. ||  || align=right | 2.6 km || 
|-id=574 bgcolor=#d6d6d6
| 529574 ||  || — || March 3, 2010 || WISE || WISE ||  || align=right | 4.0 km || 
|-id=575 bgcolor=#d6d6d6
| 529575 ||  || — || March 4, 2010 || WISE || WISE ||  || align=right | 3.2 km || 
|-id=576 bgcolor=#E9E9E9
| 529576 ||  || — || March 8, 2010 || WISE || WISE ||  || align=right | 3.1 km || 
|-id=577 bgcolor=#E9E9E9
| 529577 ||  || — || March 5, 2010 || Kitt Peak || Spacewatch ||  || align=right | 1.5 km || 
|-id=578 bgcolor=#E9E9E9
| 529578 ||  || — || March 12, 2010 || Mount Lemmon || Mount Lemmon Survey ||  || align=right | 1.9 km || 
|-id=579 bgcolor=#E9E9E9
| 529579 ||  || — || January 12, 2010 || WISE || WISE ||  || align=right | 1.6 km || 
|-id=580 bgcolor=#E9E9E9
| 529580 ||  || — || March 13, 2010 || Catalina || CSS ||  || align=right | 1.8 km || 
|-id=581 bgcolor=#E9E9E9
| 529581 ||  || — || September 23, 2008 || Mount Lemmon || Mount Lemmon Survey ||  || align=right | 1.2 km || 
|-id=582 bgcolor=#E9E9E9
| 529582 ||  || — || March 13, 2010 || Kitt Peak || Spacewatch || 526 || align=right | 2.1 km || 
|-id=583 bgcolor=#d6d6d6
| 529583 ||  || — || November 27, 2009 || Kitt Peak || Spacewatch ||  || align=right | 2.9 km || 
|-id=584 bgcolor=#d6d6d6
| 529584 ||  || — || March 16, 2010 || WISE || WISE ||  || align=right | 3.1 km || 
|-id=585 bgcolor=#fefefe
| 529585 ||  || — || March 14, 2010 || Catalina || CSS ||  || align=right | 1.4 km || 
|-id=586 bgcolor=#E9E9E9
| 529586 ||  || — || March 15, 2010 || Catalina || CSS ||  || align=right | 2.3 km || 
|-id=587 bgcolor=#E9E9E9
| 529587 ||  || — || January 16, 2010 || WISE || WISE ||  || align=right | 1.8 km || 
|-id=588 bgcolor=#d6d6d6
| 529588 ||  || — || January 16, 2010 || WISE || WISE ||  || align=right | 5.1 km || 
|-id=589 bgcolor=#E9E9E9
| 529589 ||  || — || March 12, 2010 || Siding Spring || SSS ||  || align=right | 2.3 km || 
|-id=590 bgcolor=#E9E9E9
| 529590 ||  || — || March 9, 2010 || WISE || WISE ||  || align=right | 2.1 km || 
|-id=591 bgcolor=#E9E9E9
| 529591 ||  || — || November 25, 2009 || Kitt Peak || Spacewatch ||  || align=right | 2.5 km || 
|-id=592 bgcolor=#d6d6d6
| 529592 ||  || — || September 22, 2008 || Mount Lemmon || Mount Lemmon Survey ||  || align=right | 2.8 km || 
|-id=593 bgcolor=#E9E9E9
| 529593 ||  || — || January 21, 2002 || Kitt Peak || Spacewatch ||  || align=right | 1.3 km || 
|-id=594 bgcolor=#E9E9E9
| 529594 ||  || — || July 14, 2016 || Haleakala || Pan-STARRS ||  || align=right | 1.6 km || 
|-id=595 bgcolor=#d6d6d6
| 529595 ||  || — || March 13, 2010 || Mount Lemmon || Mount Lemmon Survey ||  || align=right | 2.9 km || 
|-id=596 bgcolor=#E9E9E9
| 529596 ||  || — || March 12, 2010 || Kitt Peak || Spacewatch ||  || align=right | 1.8 km || 
|-id=597 bgcolor=#d6d6d6
| 529597 ||  || — || March 12, 2010 || Kitt Peak || Spacewatch ||  || align=right | 3.0 km || 
|-id=598 bgcolor=#E9E9E9
| 529598 ||  || — || January 14, 2010 || WISE || WISE ||  || align=right | 2.5 km || 
|-id=599 bgcolor=#E9E9E9
| 529599 ||  || — || March 19, 2010 || Mount Lemmon || Mount Lemmon Survey ||  || align=right | 1.9 km || 
|-id=600 bgcolor=#E9E9E9
| 529600 ||  || — || March 16, 2010 || WISE || WISE ||  || align=right | 3.9 km || 
|}

529601–529700 

|-bgcolor=#d6d6d6
| 529601 ||  || — || March 19, 2010 || WISE || WISE ||  || align=right | 2.8 km || 
|-id=602 bgcolor=#E9E9E9
| 529602 ||  || — || March 17, 2007 || Kitt Peak || Spacewatch ||  || align=right | 1.2 km || 
|-id=603 bgcolor=#E9E9E9
| 529603 ||  || — || April 18, 2007 || Mount Lemmon || Mount Lemmon Survey ||  || align=right | 3.8 km || 
|-id=604 bgcolor=#E9E9E9
| 529604 ||  || — || March 26, 2010 || WISE || WISE ||  || align=right | 1.9 km || 
|-id=605 bgcolor=#E9E9E9
| 529605 ||  || — || March 29, 2010 || WISE || WISE ||  || align=right | 1.3 km || 
|-id=606 bgcolor=#d6d6d6
| 529606 ||  || — || March 1, 2009 || Catalina || CSS ||  || align=right | 4.0 km || 
|-id=607 bgcolor=#d6d6d6
| 529607 ||  || — || January 8, 2010 || Mount Lemmon || Mount Lemmon Survey ||  || align=right | 2.2 km || 
|-id=608 bgcolor=#E9E9E9
| 529608 ||  || — || March 16, 2010 || Catalina || CSS ||  || align=right | 2.3 km || 
|-id=609 bgcolor=#E9E9E9
| 529609 ||  || — || March 29, 2010 || WISE || WISE ||  || align=right | 2.1 km || 
|-id=610 bgcolor=#d6d6d6
| 529610 ||  || — || March 18, 2010 || Kitt Peak || Spacewatch ||  || align=right | 1.8 km || 
|-id=611 bgcolor=#d6d6d6
| 529611 ||  || — || March 18, 2010 || Mount Lemmon || Mount Lemmon Survey ||  || align=right | 2.3 km || 
|-id=612 bgcolor=#E9E9E9
| 529612 ||  || — || March 21, 2010 || Kitt Peak || Spacewatch ||  || align=right | 1.8 km || 
|-id=613 bgcolor=#E9E9E9
| 529613 ||  || — || April 2, 2010 || WISE || WISE ||  || align=right | 2.1 km || 
|-id=614 bgcolor=#d6d6d6
| 529614 ||  || — || March 6, 2008 || Mount Lemmon || Mount Lemmon Survey ||  || align=right | 5.1 km || 
|-id=615 bgcolor=#fefefe
| 529615 ||  || — || April 3, 2010 || WISE || WISE ||  || align=right | 2.2 km || 
|-id=616 bgcolor=#E9E9E9
| 529616 ||  || — || December 18, 2009 || Mount Lemmon || Mount Lemmon Survey ||  || align=right data-sort-value="0.71" | 710 m || 
|-id=617 bgcolor=#E9E9E9
| 529617 ||  || — || January 9, 2010 || WISE || WISE ||  || align=right | 1.7 km || 
|-id=618 bgcolor=#d6d6d6
| 529618 ||  || — || October 2, 2006 || Mount Lemmon || Mount Lemmon Survey ||  || align=right | 3.1 km || 
|-id=619 bgcolor=#d6d6d6
| 529619 ||  || — || December 19, 2009 || Mount Lemmon || Mount Lemmon Survey ||  || align=right | 2.1 km || 
|-id=620 bgcolor=#E9E9E9
| 529620 ||  || — || December 27, 2009 || Kitt Peak || Spacewatch ||  || align=right | 2.9 km || 
|-id=621 bgcolor=#d6d6d6
| 529621 ||  || — || February 13, 2010 || Mount Lemmon || Mount Lemmon Survey ||  || align=right | 2.7 km || 
|-id=622 bgcolor=#fefefe
| 529622 ||  || — || April 10, 2010 || WISE || WISE ||  || align=right | 1.3 km || 
|-id=623 bgcolor=#d6d6d6
| 529623 ||  || — || December 19, 2009 || Kitt Peak || Spacewatch || 3:2 || align=right | 3.8 km || 
|-id=624 bgcolor=#d6d6d6
| 529624 ||  || — || April 14, 2010 || WISE || WISE ||  || align=right | 2.8 km || 
|-id=625 bgcolor=#E9E9E9
| 529625 ||  || — || April 5, 2010 || Kitt Peak || Spacewatch ||  || align=right | 2.0 km || 
|-id=626 bgcolor=#fefefe
| 529626 ||  || — || April 4, 2010 || Kitt Peak || Spacewatch ||  || align=right data-sort-value="0.48" | 480 m || 
|-id=627 bgcolor=#E9E9E9
| 529627 ||  || — || April 10, 2010 || Kitt Peak || Spacewatch ||  || align=right | 1.6 km || 
|-id=628 bgcolor=#d6d6d6
| 529628 ||  || — || February 6, 2003 || Kitt Peak || Spacewatch ||  || align=right | 6.2 km || 
|-id=629 bgcolor=#E9E9E9
| 529629 ||  || — || December 20, 2004 || Mount Lemmon || Mount Lemmon Survey ||  || align=right | 2.6 km || 
|-id=630 bgcolor=#E9E9E9
| 529630 ||  || — || January 24, 2010 || WISE || WISE ||  || align=right | 1.7 km || 
|-id=631 bgcolor=#E9E9E9
| 529631 ||  || — || February 1, 2005 || Kitt Peak || Spacewatch || AEO || align=right | 1.1 km || 
|-id=632 bgcolor=#E9E9E9
| 529632 ||  || — || October 8, 2008 || Mount Lemmon || Mount Lemmon Survey ||  || align=right | 2.5 km || 
|-id=633 bgcolor=#E9E9E9
| 529633 ||  || — || October 12, 2007 || Kitt Peak || Spacewatch ||  || align=right | 2.2 km || 
|-id=634 bgcolor=#d6d6d6
| 529634 ||  || — || April 9, 2010 || Kitt Peak || Spacewatch ||  || align=right | 2.7 km || 
|-id=635 bgcolor=#d6d6d6
| 529635 ||  || — || September 11, 2001 || Kitt Peak || Spacewatch ||  || align=right | 2.5 km || 
|-id=636 bgcolor=#E9E9E9
| 529636 ||  || — || August 24, 2007 || Kitt Peak || Spacewatch ||  || align=right | 1.2 km || 
|-id=637 bgcolor=#d6d6d6
| 529637 ||  || — || April 16, 2010 || WISE || WISE ||  || align=right | 4.3 km || 
|-id=638 bgcolor=#d6d6d6
| 529638 ||  || — || November 20, 2003 || Kitt Peak || Spacewatch ||  || align=right | 3.3 km || 
|-id=639 bgcolor=#E9E9E9
| 529639 ||  || — || April 5, 2010 || Mount Lemmon || Mount Lemmon Survey ||  || align=right | 2.3 km || 
|-id=640 bgcolor=#E9E9E9
| 529640 ||  || — || March 25, 2015 || Mount Lemmon || Mount Lemmon Survey ||  || align=right | 2.1 km || 
|-id=641 bgcolor=#E9E9E9
| 529641 ||  || — || April 20, 2010 || Mount Lemmon || Mount Lemmon Survey ||  || align=right | 1.5 km || 
|-id=642 bgcolor=#d6d6d6
| 529642 ||  || — || April 21, 2010 || WISE || WISE ||  || align=right | 4.1 km || 
|-id=643 bgcolor=#d6d6d6
| 529643 ||  || — || April 23, 2010 || WISE || WISE ||  || align=right | 4.6 km || 
|-id=644 bgcolor=#d6d6d6
| 529644 ||  || — || April 24, 2010 || WISE || WISE ||  || align=right | 2.0 km || 
|-id=645 bgcolor=#E9E9E9
| 529645 ||  || — || March 5, 2002 || Kitt Peak || Spacewatch ||  || align=right | 2.2 km || 
|-id=646 bgcolor=#d6d6d6
| 529646 ||  || — || April 25, 2010 || WISE || WISE ||  || align=right | 2.3 km || 
|-id=647 bgcolor=#E9E9E9
| 529647 ||  || — || February 20, 2006 || Kitt Peak || Spacewatch ||  || align=right | 2.5 km || 
|-id=648 bgcolor=#E9E9E9
| 529648 ||  || — || February 7, 2010 || Mount Lemmon || Mount Lemmon Survey ||  || align=right | 2.3 km || 
|-id=649 bgcolor=#d6d6d6
| 529649 ||  || — || April 28, 2010 || WISE || WISE ||  || align=right | 3.4 km || 
|-id=650 bgcolor=#d6d6d6
| 529650 ||  || — || April 18, 2010 || Kitt Peak || Spacewatch ||  || align=right | 2.4 km || 
|-id=651 bgcolor=#d6d6d6
| 529651 ||  || — || April 28, 2010 || WISE || WISE ||  || align=right | 5.3 km || 
|-id=652 bgcolor=#d6d6d6
| 529652 ||  || — || December 22, 2003 || Kitt Peak || Spacewatch ||  || align=right | 4.1 km || 
|-id=653 bgcolor=#E9E9E9
| 529653 ||  || — || April 29, 2010 || WISE || WISE ||  || align=right | 3.1 km || 
|-id=654 bgcolor=#d6d6d6
| 529654 ||  || — || April 29, 2010 || WISE || WISE ||  || align=right | 3.5 km || 
|-id=655 bgcolor=#d6d6d6
| 529655 ||  || — || March 3, 2009 || Catalina || CSS ||  || align=right | 3.3 km || 
|-id=656 bgcolor=#d6d6d6
| 529656 ||  || — || April 29, 2010 || WISE || WISE ||  || align=right | 3.0 km || 
|-id=657 bgcolor=#d6d6d6
| 529657 ||  || — || February 2, 2008 || Kitt Peak || Spacewatch ||  || align=right | 3.7 km || 
|-id=658 bgcolor=#E9E9E9
| 529658 ||  || — || February 9, 2010 || Catalina || CSS ||  || align=right | 3.1 km || 
|-id=659 bgcolor=#fefefe
| 529659 ||  || — || November 28, 2005 || Mount Lemmon || Mount Lemmon Survey ||  || align=right | 2.7 km || 
|-id=660 bgcolor=#E9E9E9
| 529660 ||  || — || September 4, 2008 || Kitt Peak || Spacewatch ||  || align=right | 2.1 km || 
|-id=661 bgcolor=#d6d6d6
| 529661 ||  || — || February 25, 2009 || Siding Spring || SSS ||  || align=right | 5.4 km || 
|-id=662 bgcolor=#E9E9E9
| 529662 ||  || — || January 17, 2005 || Kitt Peak || Spacewatch ||  || align=right | 1.4 km || 
|-id=663 bgcolor=#fefefe
| 529663 ||  || — || April 25, 2010 || Kitt Peak || Spacewatch ||  || align=right data-sort-value="0.49" | 490 m || 
|-id=664 bgcolor=#d6d6d6
| 529664 ||  || — || February 26, 2009 || Kitt Peak || Spacewatch ||  || align=right | 3.6 km || 
|-id=665 bgcolor=#d6d6d6
| 529665 ||  || — || October 27, 2006 || Mount Lemmon || Mount Lemmon Survey ||  || align=right | 2.5 km || 
|-id=666 bgcolor=#d6d6d6
| 529666 ||  || — || May 1, 2010 || WISE || WISE ||  || align=right | 2.6 km || 
|-id=667 bgcolor=#d6d6d6
| 529667 ||  || — || April 25, 2003 || Kitt Peak || Spacewatch ||  || align=right | 5.5 km || 
|-id=668 bgcolor=#FFC2E0
| 529668 ||  || — || May 6, 2010 || Mount Lemmon || Mount Lemmon Survey || APO +1kmPHA || align=right | 1.8 km || 
|-id=669 bgcolor=#E9E9E9
| 529669 ||  || — || November 24, 2003 || Kitt Peak || Spacewatch ||  || align=right | 3.2 km || 
|-id=670 bgcolor=#FFC2E0
| 529670 ||  || — || May 7, 2010 || Mount Lemmon || Mount Lemmon Survey || APO || align=right data-sort-value="0.53" | 530 m || 
|-id=671 bgcolor=#FA8072
| 529671 ||  || — || February 11, 2010 || WISE || WISE || H || align=right data-sort-value="0.62" | 620 m || 
|-id=672 bgcolor=#d6d6d6
| 529672 ||  || — || September 15, 2007 || Mount Lemmon || Mount Lemmon Survey ||  || align=right | 2.3 km || 
|-id=673 bgcolor=#d6d6d6
| 529673 ||  || — || January 11, 2010 || Kitt Peak || Spacewatch ||  || align=right | 3.6 km || 
|-id=674 bgcolor=#E9E9E9
| 529674 ||  || — || February 10, 2010 || WISE || WISE ||  || align=right | 1.7 km || 
|-id=675 bgcolor=#E9E9E9
| 529675 ||  || — || February 14, 2005 || Kitt Peak || Spacewatch ||  || align=right | 1.9 km || 
|-id=676 bgcolor=#d6d6d6
| 529676 ||  || — || May 12, 2010 || Kitt Peak || Spacewatch ||  || align=right | 2.7 km || 
|-id=677 bgcolor=#d6d6d6
| 529677 ||  || — || February 17, 2010 || Kitt Peak || Spacewatch ||  || align=right | 3.5 km || 
|-id=678 bgcolor=#d6d6d6
| 529678 ||  || — || February 15, 2010 || Mount Lemmon || Mount Lemmon Survey || VER || align=right | 4.6 km || 
|-id=679 bgcolor=#d6d6d6
| 529679 ||  || — || November 7, 2008 || Mount Lemmon || Mount Lemmon Survey ||  || align=right | 3.5 km || 
|-id=680 bgcolor=#d6d6d6
| 529680 ||  || — || October 3, 2005 || Catalina || CSS ||  || align=right | 2.9 km || 
|-id=681 bgcolor=#fefefe
| 529681 ||  || — || April 8, 2010 || Kitt Peak || Spacewatch ||  || align=right data-sort-value="0.81" | 810 m || 
|-id=682 bgcolor=#d6d6d6
| 529682 ||  || — || April 20, 2009 || Mount Lemmon || Mount Lemmon Survey ||  || align=right | 5.5 km || 
|-id=683 bgcolor=#d6d6d6
| 529683 ||  || — || December 28, 2003 || Kitt Peak || Spacewatch ||  || align=right | 3.6 km || 
|-id=684 bgcolor=#fefefe
| 529684 ||  || — || May 13, 2010 || WISE || WISE ||  || align=right | 1.8 km || 
|-id=685 bgcolor=#d6d6d6
| 529685 ||  || — || May 14, 2010 || WISE || WISE ||  || align=right | 4.3 km || 
|-id=686 bgcolor=#E9E9E9
| 529686 ||  || — || January 12, 2010 || Kitt Peak || Spacewatch ||  || align=right | 3.2 km || 
|-id=687 bgcolor=#d6d6d6
| 529687 ||  || — || April 25, 2003 || Kitt Peak || Spacewatch ||  || align=right | 3.3 km || 
|-id=688 bgcolor=#d6d6d6
| 529688 ||  || — || March 13, 2008 || Mount Lemmon || Mount Lemmon Survey ||  || align=right | 3.1 km || 
|-id=689 bgcolor=#fefefe
| 529689 ||  || — || May 16, 2010 || WISE || WISE ||  || align=right | 1.8 km || 
|-id=690 bgcolor=#E9E9E9
| 529690 ||  || — || April 10, 2010 || Kitt Peak || Spacewatch ||  || align=right | 1.9 km || 
|-id=691 bgcolor=#d6d6d6
| 529691 ||  || — || May 11, 2010 || Mount Lemmon || Mount Lemmon Survey || EOS || align=right | 1.4 km || 
|-id=692 bgcolor=#E9E9E9
| 529692 ||  || — || September 24, 2008 || Mount Lemmon || Mount Lemmon Survey ||  || align=right | 1.4 km || 
|-id=693 bgcolor=#E9E9E9
| 529693 ||  || — || April 25, 2010 || Mount Lemmon || Mount Lemmon Survey ||  || align=right | 2.2 km || 
|-id=694 bgcolor=#fefefe
| 529694 ||  || — || May 17, 2010 || Kitt Peak || Spacewatch ||  || align=right | 1.8 km || 
|-id=695 bgcolor=#d6d6d6
| 529695 ||  || — || May 17, 2010 || WISE || WISE ||  || align=right | 2.4 km || 
|-id=696 bgcolor=#d6d6d6
| 529696 ||  || — || May 17, 2010 || WISE || WISE ||  || align=right | 4.6 km || 
|-id=697 bgcolor=#d6d6d6
| 529697 ||  || — || May 17, 2010 || WISE || WISE ||  || align=right | 2.1 km || 
|-id=698 bgcolor=#d6d6d6
| 529698 ||  || — || March 15, 2005 || Catalina || CSS ||  || align=right | 3.3 km || 
|-id=699 bgcolor=#d6d6d6
| 529699 ||  || — || August 31, 2005 || Kitt Peak || Spacewatch ||  || align=right | 2.2 km || 
|-id=700 bgcolor=#E9E9E9
| 529700 ||  || — || May 19, 2010 || WISE || WISE ||  || align=right | 1.8 km || 
|}

529701–529800 

|-bgcolor=#d6d6d6
| 529701 ||  || — || May 21, 2010 || WISE || WISE ||  || align=right | 2.8 km || 
|-id=702 bgcolor=#d6d6d6
| 529702 ||  || — || May 22, 2010 || WISE || WISE ||  || align=right | 3.5 km || 
|-id=703 bgcolor=#d6d6d6
| 529703 ||  || — || May 23, 2010 || WISE || WISE ||  || align=right | 3.1 km || 
|-id=704 bgcolor=#d6d6d6
| 529704 ||  || — || February 18, 2010 || Kitt Peak || Spacewatch ||  || align=right | 2.9 km || 
|-id=705 bgcolor=#d6d6d6
| 529705 ||  || — || May 16, 2009 || Mount Lemmon || Mount Lemmon Survey ||  || align=right | 3.8 km || 
|-id=706 bgcolor=#E9E9E9
| 529706 ||  || — || May 23, 2010 || WISE || WISE ||  || align=right | 2.1 km || 
|-id=707 bgcolor=#d6d6d6
| 529707 ||  || — || November 2, 2008 || Mount Lemmon || Mount Lemmon Survey ||  || align=right | 2.9 km || 
|-id=708 bgcolor=#d6d6d6
| 529708 ||  || — || May 26, 2010 || WISE || WISE ||  || align=right | 3.3 km || 
|-id=709 bgcolor=#d6d6d6
| 529709 ||  || — || May 27, 2010 || WISE || WISE ||  || align=right | 4.4 km || 
|-id=710 bgcolor=#d6d6d6
| 529710 ||  || — || May 27, 2010 || WISE || WISE ||  || align=right | 2.9 km || 
|-id=711 bgcolor=#E9E9E9
| 529711 ||  || — || September 30, 2003 || Kitt Peak || Spacewatch ||  || align=right | 4.0 km || 
|-id=712 bgcolor=#fefefe
| 529712 ||  || — || May 28, 2010 || WISE || WISE ||  || align=right | 1.2 km || 
|-id=713 bgcolor=#d6d6d6
| 529713 ||  || — || May 28, 2010 || WISE || WISE ||  || align=right | 4.5 km || 
|-id=714 bgcolor=#d6d6d6
| 529714 ||  || — || September 26, 2005 || Kitt Peak || Spacewatch ||  || align=right | 2.5 km || 
|-id=715 bgcolor=#d6d6d6
| 529715 ||  || — || May 31, 2010 || WISE || WISE ||  || align=right | 2.8 km || 
|-id=716 bgcolor=#d6d6d6
| 529716 ||  || — || August 30, 2005 || Kitt Peak || Spacewatch ||  || align=right | 2.5 km || 
|-id=717 bgcolor=#d6d6d6
| 529717 ||  || — || May 31, 2010 || WISE || WISE ||  || align=right | 2.6 km || 
|-id=718 bgcolor=#FFC2E0
| 529718 ||  || — || May 31, 2010 || WISE || WISE || APO +1km || align=right | 1.8 km || 
|-id=719 bgcolor=#d6d6d6
| 529719 ||  || — || January 30, 2004 || Kitt Peak || Spacewatch ||  || align=right | 5.6 km || 
|-id=720 bgcolor=#FFC2E0
| 529720 ||  || — || June 2, 2010 || WISE || WISE || APO || align=right data-sort-value="0.36" | 360 m || 
|-id=721 bgcolor=#d6d6d6
| 529721 ||  || — || June 4, 2010 || WISE || WISE ||  || align=right | 2.3 km || 
|-id=722 bgcolor=#d6d6d6
| 529722 ||  || — || June 4, 2010 || WISE || WISE ||  || align=right | 3.6 km || 
|-id=723 bgcolor=#d6d6d6
| 529723 ||  || — || March 15, 2010 || Catalina || CSS ||  || align=right | 2.2 km || 
|-id=724 bgcolor=#d6d6d6
| 529724 ||  || — || June 6, 2010 || WISE || WISE ||  || align=right | 3.7 km || 
|-id=725 bgcolor=#d6d6d6
| 529725 ||  || — || June 6, 2010 || WISE || WISE ||  || align=right | 3.4 km || 
|-id=726 bgcolor=#fefefe
| 529726 ||  || — || November 1, 2007 || Kitt Peak || Spacewatch ||  || align=right data-sort-value="0.99" | 990 m || 
|-id=727 bgcolor=#d6d6d6
| 529727 ||  || — || June 7, 2010 || WISE || WISE ||  || align=right | 5.0 km || 
|-id=728 bgcolor=#E9E9E9
| 529728 ||  || — || June 7, 2010 || WISE || WISE ||  || align=right | 2.3 km || 
|-id=729 bgcolor=#d6d6d6
| 529729 Xida ||  ||  || March 2, 2008 || XuYi || PMO NEO ||  || align=right | 4.7 km || 
|-id=730 bgcolor=#d6d6d6
| 529730 ||  || — || June 8, 2010 || WISE || WISE ||  || align=right | 3.1 km || 
|-id=731 bgcolor=#d6d6d6
| 529731 ||  || — || April 28, 2009 || Kitt Peak || Spacewatch ||  || align=right | 2.5 km || 
|-id=732 bgcolor=#d6d6d6
| 529732 ||  || — || September 25, 2005 || Kitt Peak || Spacewatch ||  || align=right | 4.6 km || 
|-id=733 bgcolor=#E9E9E9
| 529733 ||  || — || June 8, 2010 || WISE || WISE ||  || align=right | 2.5 km || 
|-id=734 bgcolor=#d6d6d6
| 529734 ||  || — || December 21, 2008 || Catalina || CSS ||  || align=right | 3.6 km || 
|-id=735 bgcolor=#d6d6d6
| 529735 ||  || — || June 9, 2010 || WISE || WISE ||  || align=right | 3.1 km || 
|-id=736 bgcolor=#E9E9E9
| 529736 ||  || — || November 2, 2007 || Kitt Peak || Spacewatch ||  || align=right | 2.3 km || 
|-id=737 bgcolor=#d6d6d6
| 529737 ||  || — || March 19, 2009 || Kitt Peak || Spacewatch ||  || align=right | 3.6 km || 
|-id=738 bgcolor=#d6d6d6
| 529738 ||  || — || February 17, 2010 || Kitt Peak || Spacewatch ||  || align=right | 2.6 km || 
|-id=739 bgcolor=#d6d6d6
| 529739 ||  || — || June 12, 2010 || WISE || WISE || 3:2 || align=right | 4.4 km || 
|-id=740 bgcolor=#d6d6d6
| 529740 ||  || — || June 12, 2010 || WISE || WISE ||  || align=right | 2.9 km || 
|-id=741 bgcolor=#d6d6d6
| 529741 ||  || — || October 27, 2005 || Kitt Peak || Spacewatch ||  || align=right | 3.3 km || 
|-id=742 bgcolor=#d6d6d6
| 529742 ||  || — || June 13, 2010 || WISE || WISE || URS || align=right | 4.7 km || 
|-id=743 bgcolor=#d6d6d6
| 529743 ||  || — || June 13, 2010 || WISE || WISE ||  || align=right | 3.3 km || 
|-id=744 bgcolor=#fefefe
| 529744 ||  || — || April 19, 2010 || WISE || WISE ||  || align=right | 2.1 km || 
|-id=745 bgcolor=#d6d6d6
| 529745 ||  || — || June 14, 2010 || WISE || WISE ||  || align=right | 2.8 km || 
|-id=746 bgcolor=#d6d6d6
| 529746 ||  || — || March 23, 2010 || Mount Lemmon || Mount Lemmon Survey ||  || align=right | 2.8 km || 
|-id=747 bgcolor=#d6d6d6
| 529747 ||  || — || June 14, 2010 || WISE || WISE ||  || align=right | 4.2 km || 
|-id=748 bgcolor=#d6d6d6
| 529748 ||  || — || June 15, 2010 || WISE || WISE ||  || align=right | 3.2 km || 
|-id=749 bgcolor=#E9E9E9
| 529749 ||  || — || September 15, 2007 || Catalina || CSS ||  || align=right | 3.4 km || 
|-id=750 bgcolor=#d6d6d6
| 529750 ||  || — || September 23, 2005 || Kitt Peak || Spacewatch ||  || align=right | 3.1 km || 
|-id=751 bgcolor=#d6d6d6
| 529751 ||  || — || June 15, 2010 || WISE || WISE ||  || align=right | 4.0 km || 
|-id=752 bgcolor=#FFC2E0
| 529752 ||  || — || June 16, 2010 || Mount Lemmon || Mount Lemmon Survey || AMOcritical || align=right data-sort-value="0.68" | 680 m || 
|-id=753 bgcolor=#FFC2E0
| 529753 ||  || — || June 18, 2010 || Siding Spring || SSS || AMOPHAcritical || align=right data-sort-value="0.36" | 360 m || 
|-id=754 bgcolor=#fefefe
| 529754 ||  || — || June 21, 2010 || Mount Lemmon || Mount Lemmon Survey ||  || align=right data-sort-value="0.69" | 690 m || 
|-id=755 bgcolor=#E9E9E9
| 529755 ||  || — || May 8, 2006 || Mount Lemmon || Mount Lemmon Survey ||  || align=right | 2.4 km || 
|-id=756 bgcolor=#fefefe
| 529756 ||  || — || June 17, 2010 || WISE || WISE ||  || align=right | 2.7 km || 
|-id=757 bgcolor=#d6d6d6
| 529757 ||  || — || June 17, 2010 || WISE || WISE ||  || align=right | 1.7 km || 
|-id=758 bgcolor=#d6d6d6
| 529758 ||  || — || March 9, 2007 || Mount Lemmon || Mount Lemmon Survey || 7:4 || align=right | 4.7 km || 
|-id=759 bgcolor=#d6d6d6
| 529759 ||  || — || September 29, 2005 || Kitt Peak || Spacewatch ||  || align=right | 3.1 km || 
|-id=760 bgcolor=#d6d6d6
| 529760 ||  || — || November 25, 2005 || Catalina || CSS ||  || align=right | 3.8 km || 
|-id=761 bgcolor=#d6d6d6
| 529761 ||  || — || October 27, 2005 || Catalina || CSS ||  || align=right | 3.6 km || 
|-id=762 bgcolor=#E9E9E9
| 529762 ||  || — || June 23, 2010 || WISE || WISE ||  || align=right | 2.8 km || 
|-id=763 bgcolor=#d6d6d6
| 529763 ||  || — || April 4, 2008 || Kitt Peak || Spacewatch || Tj (2.99) || align=right | 5.0 km || 
|-id=764 bgcolor=#E9E9E9
| 529764 ||  || — || June 23, 2010 || WISE || WISE ||  || align=right | 2.5 km || 
|-id=765 bgcolor=#E9E9E9
| 529765 ||  || — || October 3, 2008 || Mount Lemmon || Mount Lemmon Survey ||  || align=right | 3.0 km || 
|-id=766 bgcolor=#d6d6d6
| 529766 ||  || — || June 24, 2010 || WISE || WISE ||  || align=right | 2.9 km || 
|-id=767 bgcolor=#d6d6d6
| 529767 ||  || — || June 24, 2010 || WISE || WISE ||  || align=right | 2.7 km || 
|-id=768 bgcolor=#d6d6d6
| 529768 ||  || — || June 25, 2010 || WISE || WISE ||  || align=right | 2.5 km || 
|-id=769 bgcolor=#d6d6d6
| 529769 ||  || — || March 16, 2010 || Mount Lemmon || Mount Lemmon Survey ||  || align=right | 3.0 km || 
|-id=770 bgcolor=#d6d6d6
| 529770 ||  || — || November 8, 2008 || Mount Lemmon || Mount Lemmon Survey ||  || align=right | 3.2 km || 
|-id=771 bgcolor=#d6d6d6
| 529771 ||  || — || March 25, 2010 || Mount Lemmon || Mount Lemmon Survey ||  || align=right | 3.1 km || 
|-id=772 bgcolor=#d6d6d6
| 529772 ||  || — || June 27, 2010 || WISE || WISE ||  || align=right | 4.8 km || 
|-id=773 bgcolor=#E9E9E9
| 529773 ||  || — || February 9, 2005 || Mount Lemmon || Mount Lemmon Survey ||  || align=right | 2.5 km || 
|-id=774 bgcolor=#d6d6d6
| 529774 ||  || — || January 14, 2010 || WISE || WISE ||  || align=right | 3.2 km || 
|-id=775 bgcolor=#d6d6d6
| 529775 ||  || — || June 29, 2010 || WISE || WISE ||  || align=right | 3.3 km || 
|-id=776 bgcolor=#E9E9E9
| 529776 ||  || — || March 13, 2010 || Mount Lemmon || Mount Lemmon Survey ||  || align=right | 1.7 km || 
|-id=777 bgcolor=#d6d6d6
| 529777 ||  || — || April 28, 2003 || Kitt Peak || Spacewatch ||  || align=right | 5.2 km || 
|-id=778 bgcolor=#d6d6d6
| 529778 ||  || — || October 28, 2005 || Kitt Peak || Spacewatch ||  || align=right | 5.4 km || 
|-id=779 bgcolor=#fefefe
| 529779 ||  || — || June 21, 2010 || Mount Lemmon || Mount Lemmon Survey ||  || align=right data-sort-value="0.73" | 730 m || 
|-id=780 bgcolor=#C2E0FF
| 529780 ||  || — || June 15, 2010 || Haleakala || Pan-STARRS || other TNOcritical || align=right | 367 km || 
|-id=781 bgcolor=#fefefe
| 529781 ||  || — || July 3, 2010 || WISE || WISE ||  || align=right data-sort-value="0.83" | 830 m || 
|-id=782 bgcolor=#d6d6d6
| 529782 ||  || — || December 2, 2008 || Kitt Peak || Spacewatch ||  || align=right | 3.5 km || 
|-id=783 bgcolor=#fefefe
| 529783 ||  || — || July 8, 2010 || WISE || WISE ||  || align=right | 1.1 km || 
|-id=784 bgcolor=#d6d6d6
| 529784 ||  || — || July 14, 2010 || WISE || WISE || Tj (2.97) || align=right | 4.4 km || 
|-id=785 bgcolor=#d6d6d6
| 529785 ||  || — || April 14, 2008 || Kitt Peak || Spacewatch ||  || align=right | 4.2 km || 
|-id=786 bgcolor=#d6d6d6
| 529786 ||  || — || July 15, 2010 || WISE || WISE ||  || align=right | 3.1 km || 
|-id=787 bgcolor=#d6d6d6
| 529787 ||  || — || July 1, 2010 || WISE || WISE ||  || align=right | 3.8 km || 
|-id=788 bgcolor=#d6d6d6
| 529788 ||  || — || July 12, 2010 || WISE || WISE ||  || align=right | 2.6 km || 
|-id=789 bgcolor=#d6d6d6
| 529789 ||  || — || July 12, 2010 || WISE || WISE ||  || align=right | 3.0 km || 
|-id=790 bgcolor=#fefefe
| 529790 ||  || — || July 7, 2010 || Mount Lemmon || Mount Lemmon Survey ||  || align=right data-sort-value="0.72" | 720 m || 
|-id=791 bgcolor=#E9E9E9
| 529791 ||  || — || December 15, 2006 || Mount Lemmon || Mount Lemmon Survey ||  || align=right data-sort-value="0.71" | 710 m || 
|-id=792 bgcolor=#d6d6d6
| 529792 ||  || — || March 9, 2007 || Mount Lemmon || Mount Lemmon Survey ||  || align=right | 3.1 km || 
|-id=793 bgcolor=#fefefe
| 529793 ||  || — || July 16, 2010 || WISE || WISE ||  || align=right | 1.4 km || 
|-id=794 bgcolor=#d6d6d6
| 529794 ||  || — || November 13, 2007 || Mount Lemmon || Mount Lemmon Survey ||  || align=right | 4.5 km || 
|-id=795 bgcolor=#d6d6d6
| 529795 ||  || — || December 7, 2005 || Kitt Peak || Spacewatch ||  || align=right | 3.8 km || 
|-id=796 bgcolor=#d6d6d6
| 529796 ||  || — || October 25, 2005 || Kitt Peak || Spacewatch ||  || align=right | 2.9 km || 
|-id=797 bgcolor=#d6d6d6
| 529797 ||  || — || July 18, 2010 || WISE || WISE || 7:4 || align=right | 3.3 km || 
|-id=798 bgcolor=#d6d6d6
| 529798 ||  || — || July 18, 2010 || WISE || WISE || 3:2 || align=right | 3.2 km || 
|-id=799 bgcolor=#E9E9E9
| 529799 ||  || — || July 19, 2010 || WISE || WISE ||  || align=right | 1.2 km || 
|-id=800 bgcolor=#E9E9E9
| 529800 ||  || — || October 21, 2006 || Catalina || CSS ||  || align=right | 1.7 km || 
|}

529801–529900 

|-bgcolor=#d6d6d6
| 529801 ||  || — || October 9, 1994 || Kitt Peak || Spacewatch || 3:2 || align=right | 3.8 km || 
|-id=802 bgcolor=#d6d6d6
| 529802 ||  || — || March 4, 2008 || Kitt Peak || Spacewatch ||  || align=right | 3.6 km || 
|-id=803 bgcolor=#d6d6d6
| 529803 ||  || — || July 21, 2010 || WISE || WISE ||  || align=right | 3.2 km || 
|-id=804 bgcolor=#d6d6d6
| 529804 ||  || — || April 28, 2008 || Kitt Peak || Spacewatch ||  || align=right | 3.1 km || 
|-id=805 bgcolor=#E9E9E9
| 529805 ||  || — || July 23, 2010 || WISE || WISE ||  || align=right | 3.6 km || 
|-id=806 bgcolor=#E9E9E9
| 529806 ||  || — || November 17, 2006 || Mount Lemmon || Mount Lemmon Survey ||  || align=right | 1.6 km || 
|-id=807 bgcolor=#E9E9E9
| 529807 ||  || — || July 25, 2010 || WISE || WISE ||  || align=right | 1.3 km || 
|-id=808 bgcolor=#d6d6d6
| 529808 ||  || — || July 26, 2010 || WISE || WISE || 3:2 || align=right | 4.7 km || 
|-id=809 bgcolor=#E9E9E9
| 529809 ||  || — || April 11, 2010 || Mount Lemmon || Mount Lemmon Survey ||  || align=right | 3.0 km || 
|-id=810 bgcolor=#d6d6d6
| 529810 ||  || — || July 26, 2010 || WISE || WISE ||  || align=right | 3.4 km || 
|-id=811 bgcolor=#d6d6d6
| 529811 ||  || — || April 10, 2005 || Kitt Peak || Spacewatch ||  || align=right | 3.0 km || 
|-id=812 bgcolor=#d6d6d6
| 529812 ||  || — || February 2, 2010 || WISE || WISE ||  || align=right | 2.9 km || 
|-id=813 bgcolor=#E9E9E9
| 529813 ||  || — || January 31, 2010 || WISE || WISE ||  || align=right | 3.6 km || 
|-id=814 bgcolor=#d6d6d6
| 529814 ||  || — || February 1, 2010 || WISE || WISE ||  || align=right | 2.4 km || 
|-id=815 bgcolor=#d6d6d6
| 529815 ||  || — || February 2, 2010 || WISE || WISE ||  || align=right | 2.6 km || 
|-id=816 bgcolor=#fefefe
| 529816 ||  || — || August 4, 2010 || La Sagra || OAM Obs. ||  || align=right data-sort-value="0.96" | 960 m || 
|-id=817 bgcolor=#E9E9E9
| 529817 ||  || — || August 7, 2010 || WISE || WISE ||  || align=right | 1.9 km || 
|-id=818 bgcolor=#fefefe
| 529818 ||  || — || August 10, 2010 || La Sagra || OAM Obs. ||  || align=right data-sort-value="0.75" | 750 m || 
|-id=819 bgcolor=#FFC2E0
| 529819 ||  || — || August 1, 2010 || WISE || WISE || APO || align=right data-sort-value="0.26" | 260 m || 
|-id=820 bgcolor=#fefefe
| 529820 ||  || — || August 10, 2010 || Kitt Peak || Spacewatch ||  || align=right data-sort-value="0.58" | 580 m || 
|-id=821 bgcolor=#fefefe
| 529821 ||  || — || August 13, 2010 || Socorro || LINEAR ||  || align=right data-sort-value="0.71" | 710 m || 
|-id=822 bgcolor=#fefefe
| 529822 ||  || — || August 7, 2010 || La Sagra || OAM Obs. ||  || align=right data-sort-value="0.59" | 590 m || 
|-id=823 bgcolor=#C2E0FF
| 529823 ||  || — || July 12, 2010 || Haleakala || Pan-STARRS || SDOcritical || align=right | 192 km || 
|-id=824 bgcolor=#fefefe
| 529824 ||  || — || August 16, 2010 || La Sagra || OAM Obs. ||  || align=right data-sort-value="0.97" | 970 m || 
|-id=825 bgcolor=#FA8072
| 529825 ||  || — || August 29, 2010 || La Sagra || OAM Obs. ||  || align=right data-sort-value="0.76" | 760 m || 
|-id=826 bgcolor=#fefefe
| 529826 ||  || — || September 1, 2010 || Socorro || LINEAR ||  || align=right data-sort-value="0.70" | 700 m || 
|-id=827 bgcolor=#fefefe
| 529827 ||  || — || August 13, 2010 || Kitt Peak || Spacewatch ||  || align=right data-sort-value="0.71" | 710 m || 
|-id=828 bgcolor=#fefefe
| 529828 Jinhuayizhong ||  ||  || August 8, 2010 || XuYi || PMO NEO ||  || align=right data-sort-value="0.87" | 870 m || 
|-id=829 bgcolor=#fefefe
| 529829 ||  || — || September 3, 2010 || Piszkéstető || K. Sárneczky, Z. Kuli ||  || align=right data-sort-value="0.62" | 620 m || 
|-id=830 bgcolor=#fefefe
| 529830 ||  || — || September 2, 2010 || Mount Lemmon || Mount Lemmon Survey ||  || align=right data-sort-value="0.69" | 690 m || 
|-id=831 bgcolor=#fefefe
| 529831 ||  || — || September 4, 2010 || Kitt Peak || Spacewatch || NYS || align=right data-sort-value="0.52" | 520 m || 
|-id=832 bgcolor=#fefefe
| 529832 ||  || — || September 4, 2010 || Kitt Peak || Spacewatch ||  || align=right data-sort-value="0.68" | 680 m || 
|-id=833 bgcolor=#fefefe
| 529833 ||  || — || September 4, 2010 || Kitt Peak || Spacewatch ||  || align=right data-sort-value="0.60" | 600 m || 
|-id=834 bgcolor=#fefefe
| 529834 ||  || — || September 4, 2010 || Kitt Peak || Spacewatch || NYS || align=right data-sort-value="0.55" | 550 m || 
|-id=835 bgcolor=#E9E9E9
| 529835 ||  || — || September 5, 2010 || La Sagra || OAM Obs. ||  || align=right | 1.1 km || 
|-id=836 bgcolor=#fefefe
| 529836 ||  || — || September 1, 2010 || Mount Lemmon || Mount Lemmon Survey || MAS || align=right data-sort-value="0.65" | 650 m || 
|-id=837 bgcolor=#fefefe
| 529837 ||  || — || September 6, 2010 || La Sagra || OAM Obs. ||  || align=right | 1.1 km || 
|-id=838 bgcolor=#fefefe
| 529838 ||  || — || July 21, 2006 || Mount Lemmon || Mount Lemmon Survey || MAS || align=right data-sort-value="0.65" | 650 m || 
|-id=839 bgcolor=#fefefe
| 529839 ||  || — || September 2, 2010 || Mount Lemmon || Mount Lemmon Survey ||  || align=right data-sort-value="0.64" | 640 m || 
|-id=840 bgcolor=#fefefe
| 529840 ||  || — || May 29, 2010 || WISE || WISE ||  || align=right data-sort-value="0.64" | 640 m || 
|-id=841 bgcolor=#FA8072
| 529841 ||  || — || September 3, 2010 || La Sagra || OAM Obs. ||  || align=right data-sort-value="0.68" | 680 m || 
|-id=842 bgcolor=#E9E9E9
| 529842 ||  || — || September 3, 2010 || La Sagra || OAM Obs. ||  || align=right | 2.1 km || 
|-id=843 bgcolor=#fefefe
| 529843 ||  || — || September 5, 2010 || La Sagra || OAM Obs. ||  || align=right data-sort-value="0.83" | 830 m || 
|-id=844 bgcolor=#fefefe
| 529844 ||  || — || August 29, 2006 || Kitt Peak || Spacewatch ||  || align=right data-sort-value="0.62" | 620 m || 
|-id=845 bgcolor=#fefefe
| 529845 ||  || — || September 10, 2010 || Kitt Peak || Spacewatch ||  || align=right data-sort-value="0.51" | 510 m || 
|-id=846 bgcolor=#fefefe
| 529846 ||  || — || September 10, 2010 || Kitt Peak || Spacewatch ||  || align=right data-sort-value="0.66" | 660 m || 
|-id=847 bgcolor=#E9E9E9
| 529847 ||  || — || September 19, 2006 || Kitt Peak || Spacewatch ||  || align=right data-sort-value="0.62" | 620 m || 
|-id=848 bgcolor=#d6d6d6
| 529848 ||  || — || September 11, 2010 || Kitt Peak || Spacewatch ||  || align=right | 2.5 km || 
|-id=849 bgcolor=#fefefe
| 529849 ||  || — || September 11, 2010 || Kitt Peak || Spacewatch ||  || align=right data-sort-value="0.75" | 750 m || 
|-id=850 bgcolor=#fefefe
| 529850 ||  || — || September 11, 2010 || Kitt Peak || Spacewatch ||  || align=right data-sort-value="0.75" | 750 m || 
|-id=851 bgcolor=#fefefe
| 529851 ||  || — || September 11, 2010 || Kitt Peak || Spacewatch || MAS || align=right data-sort-value="0.57" | 570 m || 
|-id=852 bgcolor=#fefefe
| 529852 ||  || — || September 11, 2010 || Kitt Peak || Spacewatch ||  || align=right data-sort-value="0.58" | 580 m || 
|-id=853 bgcolor=#fefefe
| 529853 ||  || — || September 11, 2010 || Kitt Peak || Spacewatch ||  || align=right data-sort-value="0.76" | 760 m || 
|-id=854 bgcolor=#fefefe
| 529854 ||  || — || August 28, 2006 || Kitt Peak || Spacewatch ||  || align=right data-sort-value="0.47" | 470 m || 
|-id=855 bgcolor=#d6d6d6
| 529855 ||  || — || September 12, 2010 || Kitt Peak || Spacewatch || 3:2 || align=right | 3.5 km || 
|-id=856 bgcolor=#fefefe
| 529856 ||  || — || September 12, 2010 || Kitt Peak || Spacewatch || NYS || align=right data-sort-value="0.62" | 620 m || 
|-id=857 bgcolor=#fefefe
| 529857 ||  || — || September 12, 2010 || Kitt Peak || Spacewatch ||  || align=right data-sort-value="0.60" | 600 m || 
|-id=858 bgcolor=#fefefe
| 529858 ||  || — || September 15, 2010 || Catalina || CSS || H || align=right data-sort-value="0.53" | 530 m || 
|-id=859 bgcolor=#d6d6d6
| 529859 ||  || — || September 15, 2010 || Kitt Peak || Spacewatch ||  || align=right | 1.9 km || 
|-id=860 bgcolor=#fefefe
| 529860 ||  || — || September 11, 2010 || Kitt Peak || Spacewatch || MAS || align=right data-sort-value="0.55" | 550 m || 
|-id=861 bgcolor=#fefefe
| 529861 ||  || — || October 20, 2007 || Mount Lemmon || Mount Lemmon Survey ||  || align=right data-sort-value="0.59" | 590 m || 
|-id=862 bgcolor=#d6d6d6
| 529862 ||  || — || September 6, 2010 || Kitt Peak || Spacewatch ||  || align=right | 2.8 km || 
|-id=863 bgcolor=#d6d6d6
| 529863 ||  || — || September 14, 2010 || Kitt Peak || Spacewatch ||  || align=right | 2.6 km || 
|-id=864 bgcolor=#fefefe
| 529864 ||  || — || August 5, 2010 || Kitt Peak || Spacewatch ||  || align=right | 1.2 km || 
|-id=865 bgcolor=#fefefe
| 529865 ||  || — || September 15, 2010 || Kitt Peak || Spacewatch ||  || align=right data-sort-value="0.70" | 700 m || 
|-id=866 bgcolor=#fefefe
| 529866 ||  || — || September 6, 2010 || La Sagra || OAM Obs. ||  || align=right | 1.3 km || 
|-id=867 bgcolor=#fefefe
| 529867 ||  || — || September 10, 2010 || Mount Lemmon || Mount Lemmon Survey ||  || align=right data-sort-value="0.79" | 790 m || 
|-id=868 bgcolor=#E9E9E9
| 529868 ||  || — || September 15, 2006 || Kitt Peak || Spacewatch ||  || align=right data-sort-value="0.68" | 680 m || 
|-id=869 bgcolor=#E9E9E9
| 529869 ||  || — || September 9, 2010 || Kitt Peak || Spacewatch ||  || align=right data-sort-value="0.49" | 490 m || 
|-id=870 bgcolor=#d6d6d6
| 529870 ||  || — || September 10, 2010 || Kitt Peak || Spacewatch ||  || align=right | 2.4 km || 
|-id=871 bgcolor=#d6d6d6
| 529871 ||  || — || September 30, 2005 || Mount Lemmon || Mount Lemmon Survey ||  || align=right | 2.1 km || 
|-id=872 bgcolor=#fefefe
| 529872 ||  || — || September 11, 2010 || Mount Lemmon || Mount Lemmon Survey ||  || align=right data-sort-value="0.89" | 890 m || 
|-id=873 bgcolor=#d6d6d6
| 529873 ||  || — || September 2, 2010 || Mount Lemmon || Mount Lemmon Survey ||  || align=right | 2.5 km || 
|-id=874 bgcolor=#fefefe
| 529874 ||  || — || September 14, 1996 || Kitt Peak || Spacewatch ||  || align=right data-sort-value="0.81" | 810 m || 
|-id=875 bgcolor=#fefefe
| 529875 ||  || — || November 12, 2007 || Mount Lemmon || Mount Lemmon Survey ||  || align=right data-sort-value="0.73" | 730 m || 
|-id=876 bgcolor=#fefefe
| 529876 ||  || — || September 10, 2010 || Mount Lemmon || Mount Lemmon Survey ||  || align=right data-sort-value="0.63" | 630 m || 
|-id=877 bgcolor=#E9E9E9
| 529877 ||  || — || September 2, 2010 || Mount Lemmon || Mount Lemmon Survey ||  || align=right data-sort-value="0.92" | 920 m || 
|-id=878 bgcolor=#fefefe
| 529878 ||  || — || March 18, 2004 || Socorro || LINEAR || H || align=right data-sort-value="0.68" | 680 m || 
|-id=879 bgcolor=#FA8072
| 529879 ||  || — || September 17, 2010 || Catalina || CSS ||  || align=right data-sort-value="0.68" | 680 m || 
|-id=880 bgcolor=#fefefe
| 529880 ||  || — || September 29, 2010 || Mount Lemmon || Mount Lemmon Survey || H || align=right data-sort-value="0.49" | 490 m || 
|-id=881 bgcolor=#fefefe
| 529881 ||  || — || August 28, 2006 || Kitt Peak || Spacewatch ||  || align=right data-sort-value="0.65" | 650 m || 
|-id=882 bgcolor=#fefefe
| 529882 ||  || — || September 10, 2010 || Mount Lemmon || Mount Lemmon Survey ||  || align=right data-sort-value="0.56" | 560 m || 
|-id=883 bgcolor=#fefefe
| 529883 ||  || — || September 14, 2010 || Kitt Peak || Spacewatch ||  || align=right data-sort-value="0.51" | 510 m || 
|-id=884 bgcolor=#fefefe
| 529884 ||  || — || September 30, 2010 || Mount Lemmon || Mount Lemmon Survey ||  || align=right data-sort-value="0.64" | 640 m || 
|-id=885 bgcolor=#fefefe
| 529885 ||  || — || September 30, 2010 || Mount Lemmon || Mount Lemmon Survey ||  || align=right data-sort-value="0.54" | 540 m || 
|-id=886 bgcolor=#fefefe
| 529886 ||  || — || September 30, 2010 || Mount Lemmon || Mount Lemmon Survey ||  || align=right | 1.1 km || 
|-id=887 bgcolor=#fefefe
| 529887 ||  || — || September 30, 2010 || Mount Lemmon || Mount Lemmon Survey ||  || align=right data-sort-value="0.86" | 860 m || 
|-id=888 bgcolor=#fefefe
| 529888 ||  || — || February 2, 2008 || Mount Lemmon || Mount Lemmon Survey ||  || align=right data-sort-value="0.80" | 800 m || 
|-id=889 bgcolor=#fefefe
| 529889 ||  || — || September 18, 2010 || Mount Lemmon || Mount Lemmon Survey ||  || align=right | 1.0 km || 
|-id=890 bgcolor=#fefefe
| 529890 ||  || — || September 17, 2010 || Mount Lemmon || Mount Lemmon Survey ||  || align=right data-sort-value="0.80" | 800 m || 
|-id=891 bgcolor=#E9E9E9
| 529891 ||  || — || September 19, 2010 || Kitt Peak || Spacewatch ||  || align=right | 1.3 km || 
|-id=892 bgcolor=#d6d6d6
| 529892 ||  || — || September 19, 2010 || Kitt Peak || Spacewatch ||  || align=right | 2.0 km || 
|-id=893 bgcolor=#fefefe
| 529893 ||  || — || January 1, 2008 || Kitt Peak || Spacewatch ||  || align=right data-sort-value="0.65" | 650 m || 
|-id=894 bgcolor=#d6d6d6
| 529894 ||  || — || September 15, 2010 || Kitt Peak || Spacewatch ||  || align=right | 2.5 km || 
|-id=895 bgcolor=#E9E9E9
| 529895 ||  || — || September 19, 2006 || Kitt Peak || Spacewatch || MAR || align=right data-sort-value="0.67" | 670 m || 
|-id=896 bgcolor=#d6d6d6
| 529896 ||  || — || July 16, 2010 || WISE || WISE ||  || align=right | 2.4 km || 
|-id=897 bgcolor=#E9E9E9
| 529897 ||  || — || July 13, 2010 || Kitt Peak || Spacewatch ||  || align=right | 1.4 km || 
|-id=898 bgcolor=#fefefe
| 529898 ||  || — || October 1, 2010 || Kitt Peak || Spacewatch ||  || align=right data-sort-value="0.62" | 620 m || 
|-id=899 bgcolor=#E9E9E9
| 529899 ||  || — || August 29, 2006 || Kitt Peak || Spacewatch ||  || align=right data-sort-value="0.54" | 540 m || 
|-id=900 bgcolor=#d6d6d6
| 529900 ||  || — || September 17, 2010 || Kitt Peak || Spacewatch ||  || align=right | 3.1 km || 
|}

529901–530000 

|-bgcolor=#fefefe
| 529901 ||  || — || June 20, 2006 || Mount Lemmon || Mount Lemmon Survey || MAS || align=right data-sort-value="0.68" | 680 m || 
|-id=902 bgcolor=#fefefe
| 529902 ||  || — || September 18, 2010 || Mount Lemmon || Mount Lemmon Survey ||  || align=right data-sort-value="0.78" | 780 m || 
|-id=903 bgcolor=#d6d6d6
| 529903 ||  || — || September 16, 2010 || Kitt Peak || Spacewatch || 3:2 || align=right | 3.4 km || 
|-id=904 bgcolor=#fefefe
| 529904 ||  || — || October 3, 2010 || Kitt Peak || Spacewatch ||  || align=right data-sort-value="0.58" | 580 m || 
|-id=905 bgcolor=#fefefe
| 529905 ||  || — || September 26, 2006 || Catalina || CSS ||  || align=right data-sort-value="0.86" | 860 m || 
|-id=906 bgcolor=#d6d6d6
| 529906 ||  || — || September 8, 2010 || Kitt Peak || Spacewatch ||  || align=right | 3.3 km || 
|-id=907 bgcolor=#fefefe
| 529907 ||  || — || September 8, 2010 || Kitt Peak || Spacewatch ||  || align=right data-sort-value="0.65" | 650 m || 
|-id=908 bgcolor=#E9E9E9
| 529908 ||  || — || September 27, 2006 || Kitt Peak || Spacewatch ||  || align=right data-sort-value="0.52" | 520 m || 
|-id=909 bgcolor=#d6d6d6
| 529909 ||  || — || March 6, 2008 || Kitt Peak || Spacewatch ||  || align=right | 2.8 km || 
|-id=910 bgcolor=#E9E9E9
| 529910 ||  || — || September 25, 2006 || Kitt Peak || Spacewatch ||  || align=right data-sort-value="0.75" | 750 m || 
|-id=911 bgcolor=#fefefe
| 529911 ||  || — || October 8, 2010 || Socorro || LINEAR || H || align=right data-sort-value="0.85" | 850 m || 
|-id=912 bgcolor=#fefefe
| 529912 ||  || — || October 1, 2010 || Kitt Peak || Spacewatch ||  || align=right data-sort-value="0.61" | 610 m || 
|-id=913 bgcolor=#fefefe
| 529913 ||  || — || September 16, 2010 || Kitt Peak || Spacewatch ||  || align=right data-sort-value="0.71" | 710 m || 
|-id=914 bgcolor=#fefefe
| 529914 ||  || — || October 20, 2003 || Kitt Peak || Spacewatch ||  || align=right data-sort-value="0.49" | 490 m || 
|-id=915 bgcolor=#fefefe
| 529915 ||  || — || September 4, 2010 || Kitt Peak || Spacewatch ||  || align=right data-sort-value="0.51" | 510 m || 
|-id=916 bgcolor=#d6d6d6
| 529916 ||  || — || October 1, 2010 || Mount Lemmon || Mount Lemmon Survey ||  || align=right | 2.2 km || 
|-id=917 bgcolor=#d6d6d6
| 529917 ||  || — || October 1, 2010 || Mount Lemmon || Mount Lemmon Survey ||  || align=right | 2.4 km || 
|-id=918 bgcolor=#fefefe
| 529918 ||  || — || October 1, 2010 || Mount Lemmon || Mount Lemmon Survey ||  || align=right data-sort-value="0.77" | 770 m || 
|-id=919 bgcolor=#d6d6d6
| 529919 ||  || — || September 30, 2010 || Mount Lemmon || Mount Lemmon Survey ||  || align=right | 2.4 km || 
|-id=920 bgcolor=#FFC2E0
| 529920 ||  || — || October 9, 2010 || Mount Lemmon || Mount Lemmon Survey || AMOcritical || align=right data-sort-value="0.49" | 490 m || 
|-id=921 bgcolor=#E9E9E9
| 529921 ||  || — || September 17, 2010 || Mount Lemmon || Mount Lemmon Survey ||  || align=right data-sort-value="0.52" | 520 m || 
|-id=922 bgcolor=#fefefe
| 529922 ||  || — || October 3, 2010 || Catalina || CSS ||  || align=right data-sort-value="0.88" | 880 m || 
|-id=923 bgcolor=#d6d6d6
| 529923 ||  || — || March 13, 2008 || Kitt Peak || Spacewatch ||  || align=right | 2.2 km || 
|-id=924 bgcolor=#E9E9E9
| 529924 ||  || — || October 19, 2006 || Kitt Peak || Spacewatch ||  || align=right data-sort-value="0.62" | 620 m || 
|-id=925 bgcolor=#fefefe
| 529925 ||  || — || December 31, 2007 || Kitt Peak || Spacewatch ||  || align=right data-sort-value="0.80" | 800 m || 
|-id=926 bgcolor=#E9E9E9
| 529926 ||  || — || October 12, 2010 || Kitt Peak || Spacewatch ||  || align=right | 1.9 km || 
|-id=927 bgcolor=#E9E9E9
| 529927 ||  || — || September 30, 2010 || La Sagra || OAM Obs. ||  || align=right | 1.1 km || 
|-id=928 bgcolor=#FA8072
| 529928 ||  || — || October 9, 2010 || Catalina || CSS || H || align=right data-sort-value="0.69" | 690 m || 
|-id=929 bgcolor=#fefefe
| 529929 ||  || — || March 22, 2009 || Mount Lemmon || Mount Lemmon Survey ||  || align=right data-sort-value="0.60" | 600 m || 
|-id=930 bgcolor=#fefefe
| 529930 ||  || — || October 13, 2010 || Catalina || CSS || H || align=right data-sort-value="0.49" | 490 m || 
|-id=931 bgcolor=#fefefe
| 529931 ||  || — || November 15, 1995 || Kitt Peak || Spacewatch || NYS || align=right data-sort-value="0.45" | 450 m || 
|-id=932 bgcolor=#fefefe
| 529932 ||  || — || November 19, 2007 || Mount Lemmon || Mount Lemmon Survey ||  || align=right data-sort-value="0.64" | 640 m || 
|-id=933 bgcolor=#FA8072
| 529933 ||  || — || July 25, 2010 || WISE || WISE ||  || align=right data-sort-value="0.99" | 990 m || 
|-id=934 bgcolor=#fefefe
| 529934 ||  || — || June 11, 2010 || WISE || WISE ||  || align=right data-sort-value="0.71" | 710 m || 
|-id=935 bgcolor=#FA8072
| 529935 ||  || — || September 30, 2006 || Catalina || CSS ||  || align=right data-sort-value="0.36" | 360 m || 
|-id=936 bgcolor=#fefefe
| 529936 ||  || — || August 19, 2006 || Kitt Peak || Spacewatch ||  || align=right data-sort-value="0.67" | 670 m || 
|-id=937 bgcolor=#fefefe
| 529937 ||  || — || September 29, 2010 || Mount Lemmon || Mount Lemmon Survey ||  || align=right data-sort-value="0.74" | 740 m || 
|-id=938 bgcolor=#C2E0FF
| 529938 ||  || — || October 6, 2010 || Haleakala || Pan-STARRS || plutino || align=right | 175 km || 
|-id=939 bgcolor=#C7FF8F
| 529939 ||  || — || October 7, 2010 || Haleakala || Pan-STARRS || centaur || align=right | 31 km || 
|-id=940 bgcolor=#C2E0FF
| 529940 ||  || — || October 7, 2010 || Haleakala || Pan-STARRS || SDO || align=right | 228 km || 
|-id=941 bgcolor=#fefefe
| 529941 ||  || — || February 13, 2008 || Mount Lemmon || Mount Lemmon Survey ||  || align=right data-sort-value="0.69" | 690 m || 
|-id=942 bgcolor=#fefefe
| 529942 ||  || — || January 12, 2008 || Mount Lemmon || Mount Lemmon Survey ||  || align=right data-sort-value="0.96" | 960 m || 
|-id=943 bgcolor=#E9E9E9
| 529943 ||  || — || October 14, 2010 || Mount Lemmon || Mount Lemmon Survey ||  || align=right | 1.2 km || 
|-id=944 bgcolor=#E9E9E9
| 529944 ||  || — || February 13, 2008 || Kitt Peak || Spacewatch ||  || align=right data-sort-value="0.85" | 850 m || 
|-id=945 bgcolor=#fefefe
| 529945 ||  || — || October 1, 2010 || Kitt Peak || Spacewatch ||  || align=right data-sort-value="0.72" | 720 m || 
|-id=946 bgcolor=#fefefe
| 529946 ||  || — || December 16, 2007 || Catalina || CSS ||  || align=right data-sort-value="0.87" | 870 m || 
|-id=947 bgcolor=#fefefe
| 529947 ||  || — || October 1, 2010 || Mount Lemmon || Mount Lemmon Survey ||  || align=right data-sort-value="0.68" | 680 m || 
|-id=948 bgcolor=#d6d6d6
| 529948 ||  || — || July 26, 2010 || WISE || WISE ||  || align=right | 2.9 km || 
|-id=949 bgcolor=#fefefe
| 529949 ||  || — || October 2, 2010 || Mount Lemmon || Mount Lemmon Survey ||  || align=right data-sort-value="0.81" | 810 m || 
|-id=950 bgcolor=#E9E9E9
| 529950 ||  || — || October 9, 2010 || Catalina || CSS ||  || align=right | 1.2 km || 
|-id=951 bgcolor=#FFC2E0
| 529951 ||  || — || October 17, 2010 || Mount Lemmon || Mount Lemmon Survey || APOPHAcritical || align=right data-sort-value="0.22" | 220 m || 
|-id=952 bgcolor=#fefefe
| 529952 ||  || — || June 13, 2004 || Kitt Peak || Spacewatch || H || align=right data-sort-value="0.71" | 710 m || 
|-id=953 bgcolor=#E9E9E9
| 529953 ||  || — || November 11, 2006 || Kitt Peak || Spacewatch ||  || align=right data-sort-value="0.82" | 820 m || 
|-id=954 bgcolor=#fefefe
| 529954 ||  || — || October 28, 2010 || Kitt Peak || Spacewatch || H || align=right data-sort-value="0.74" | 740 m || 
|-id=955 bgcolor=#E9E9E9
| 529955 ||  || — || October 28, 2010 || Mount Lemmon || Mount Lemmon Survey ||  || align=right data-sort-value="0.94" | 940 m || 
|-id=956 bgcolor=#fefefe
| 529956 ||  || — || October 17, 2010 || Catalina || CSS || H || align=right data-sort-value="0.55" | 550 m || 
|-id=957 bgcolor=#fefefe
| 529957 ||  || — || August 29, 2006 || Catalina || CSS ||  || align=right data-sort-value="0.81" | 810 m || 
|-id=958 bgcolor=#E9E9E9
| 529958 ||  || — || October 29, 2010 || Kitt Peak || Spacewatch ||  || align=right data-sort-value="0.78" | 780 m || 
|-id=959 bgcolor=#fefefe
| 529959 ||  || — || October 29, 2010 || Kitt Peak || Spacewatch || H || align=right data-sort-value="0.43" | 430 m || 
|-id=960 bgcolor=#E9E9E9
| 529960 ||  || — || November 17, 2006 || Kitt Peak || Spacewatch ||  || align=right | 1.2 km || 
|-id=961 bgcolor=#d6d6d6
| 529961 ||  || — || October 31, 2010 || Mount Lemmon || Mount Lemmon Survey ||  || align=right | 2.8 km || 
|-id=962 bgcolor=#fefefe
| 529962 ||  || — || October 17, 2010 || Mount Lemmon || Mount Lemmon Survey ||  || align=right data-sort-value="0.51" | 510 m || 
|-id=963 bgcolor=#E9E9E9
| 529963 ||  || — || October 30, 2010 || Kitt Peak || Spacewatch ||  || align=right data-sort-value="0.92" | 920 m || 
|-id=964 bgcolor=#E9E9E9
| 529964 ||  || — || October 30, 2010 || Kitt Peak || Spacewatch ||  || align=right data-sort-value="0.70" | 700 m || 
|-id=965 bgcolor=#d6d6d6
| 529965 ||  || — || October 30, 2010 || Kitt Peak || Spacewatch ||  || align=right | 3.7 km || 
|-id=966 bgcolor=#E9E9E9
| 529966 ||  || — || October 30, 2010 || Kitt Peak || Spacewatch ||  || align=right data-sort-value="0.75" | 750 m || 
|-id=967 bgcolor=#E9E9E9
| 529967 ||  || — || October 13, 2010 || Mount Lemmon || Mount Lemmon Survey ||  || align=right data-sort-value="0.87" | 870 m || 
|-id=968 bgcolor=#fefefe
| 529968 ||  || — || November 15, 1995 || Kitt Peak || Spacewatch ||  || align=right data-sort-value="0.68" | 680 m || 
|-id=969 bgcolor=#E9E9E9
| 529969 ||  || — || December 13, 2006 || Catalina || CSS ||  || align=right | 1.3 km || 
|-id=970 bgcolor=#FA8072
| 529970 ||  || — || September 11, 2010 || Catalina || CSS ||  || align=right data-sort-value="0.85" | 850 m || 
|-id=971 bgcolor=#E9E9E9
| 529971 ||  || — || October 28, 2010 || Mount Lemmon || Mount Lemmon Survey || KON || align=right | 1.7 km || 
|-id=972 bgcolor=#d6d6d6
| 529972 ||  || — || October 13, 2010 || Mount Lemmon || Mount Lemmon Survey || 3:2 || align=right | 4.5 km || 
|-id=973 bgcolor=#fefefe
| 529973 ||  || — || September 11, 2010 || Mount Lemmon || Mount Lemmon Survey || V || align=right data-sort-value="0.52" | 520 m || 
|-id=974 bgcolor=#E9E9E9
| 529974 ||  || — || October 14, 2010 || Mount Lemmon || Mount Lemmon Survey ||  || align=right | 1.2 km || 
|-id=975 bgcolor=#E9E9E9
| 529975 ||  || — || November 11, 2006 || Mount Lemmon || Mount Lemmon Survey ||  || align=right data-sort-value="0.59" | 590 m || 
|-id=976 bgcolor=#d6d6d6
| 529976 ||  || — || April 15, 2008 || Mount Lemmon || Mount Lemmon Survey ||  || align=right | 2.8 km || 
|-id=977 bgcolor=#d6d6d6
| 529977 ||  || — || October 28, 2010 || Mount Lemmon || Mount Lemmon Survey ||  || align=right | 2.5 km || 
|-id=978 bgcolor=#d6d6d6
| 529978 ||  || — || May 5, 2008 || Mount Lemmon || Mount Lemmon Survey ||  || align=right | 3.7 km || 
|-id=979 bgcolor=#fefefe
| 529979 ||  || — || October 19, 2010 || Mount Lemmon || Mount Lemmon Survey ||  || align=right data-sort-value="0.72" | 720 m || 
|-id=980 bgcolor=#fefefe
| 529980 ||  || — || February 22, 2009 || Kitt Peak || Spacewatch ||  || align=right data-sort-value="0.69" | 690 m || 
|-id=981 bgcolor=#d6d6d6
| 529981 ||  || — || April 15, 2008 || Mount Lemmon || Mount Lemmon Survey ||  || align=right | 2.5 km || 
|-id=982 bgcolor=#E9E9E9
| 529982 ||  || — || September 3, 2010 || Mount Lemmon || Mount Lemmon Survey ||  || align=right data-sort-value="0.90" | 900 m || 
|-id=983 bgcolor=#fefefe
| 529983 ||  || — || April 14, 2004 || Kitt Peak || Spacewatch || H || align=right data-sort-value="0.65" | 650 m || 
|-id=984 bgcolor=#E9E9E9
| 529984 ||  || — || September 16, 2010 || Mount Lemmon || Mount Lemmon Survey ||  || align=right data-sort-value="0.90" | 900 m || 
|-id=985 bgcolor=#d6d6d6
| 529985 ||  || — || November 1, 2010 || Kitt Peak || Spacewatch ||  || align=right | 2.9 km || 
|-id=986 bgcolor=#fefefe
| 529986 ||  || — || October 12, 2010 || Mount Lemmon || Mount Lemmon Survey ||  || align=right data-sort-value="0.87" | 870 m || 
|-id=987 bgcolor=#fefefe
| 529987 ||  || — || April 17, 2009 || Kitt Peak || Spacewatch || H || align=right data-sort-value="0.59" | 590 m || 
|-id=988 bgcolor=#E9E9E9
| 529988 ||  || — || October 17, 2010 || Mount Lemmon || Mount Lemmon Survey ||  || align=right data-sort-value="0.83" | 830 m || 
|-id=989 bgcolor=#fefefe
| 529989 ||  || — || November 3, 2010 || La Sagra || OAM Obs. || H || align=right data-sort-value="0.64" | 640 m || 
|-id=990 bgcolor=#E9E9E9
| 529990 ||  || — || November 20, 2006 || Kitt Peak || Spacewatch ||  || align=right data-sort-value="0.68" | 680 m || 
|-id=991 bgcolor=#d6d6d6
| 529991 ||  || — || October 17, 2010 || Mount Lemmon || Mount Lemmon Survey ||  || align=right | 2.4 km || 
|-id=992 bgcolor=#E9E9E9
| 529992 ||  || — || September 11, 2010 || Mount Lemmon || Mount Lemmon Survey ||  || align=right data-sort-value="0.74" | 740 m || 
|-id=993 bgcolor=#fefefe
| 529993 ||  || — || October 17, 2010 || Mount Lemmon || Mount Lemmon Survey ||  || align=right data-sort-value="0.50" | 500 m || 
|-id=994 bgcolor=#d6d6d6
| 529994 ||  || — || October 14, 2010 || Mount Lemmon || Mount Lemmon Survey ||  || align=right | 3.5 km || 
|-id=995 bgcolor=#E9E9E9
| 529995 ||  || — || October 14, 2010 || Mount Lemmon || Mount Lemmon Survey ||  || align=right | 1.1 km || 
|-id=996 bgcolor=#fefefe
| 529996 ||  || — || October 20, 2006 || Kitt Peak || Spacewatch ||  || align=right data-sort-value="0.75" | 750 m || 
|-id=997 bgcolor=#fefefe
| 529997 ||  || — || October 19, 2010 || Mount Lemmon || Mount Lemmon Survey ||  || align=right data-sort-value="0.67" | 670 m || 
|-id=998 bgcolor=#E9E9E9
| 529998 ||  || — || October 13, 2010 || Mount Lemmon || Mount Lemmon Survey ||  || align=right data-sort-value="0.86" | 860 m || 
|-id=999 bgcolor=#fefefe
| 529999 ||  || — || November 7, 2010 || Kitt Peak || Spacewatch || H || align=right data-sort-value="0.51" | 510 m || 
|-id=000 bgcolor=#FA8072
| 530000 ||  || — || May 16, 2009 || Mount Lemmon || Mount Lemmon Survey || H || align=right data-sort-value="0.64" | 640 m || 
|}

References

External links 
 Discovery Circumstances: Numbered Minor Planets (525001)–(530000) (IAU Minor Planet Center)

0529